A business entity is an entity that is formed and administered as per corporate law in order to engage in business activities, charitable work, or other activities allowable. Most often, business entities are formed to sell a product or a service. There are many types of business entities defined in the legal systems of various countries. These include corporations, cooperatives, partnerships, sole traders, limited liability companies and other specifically permitted and labelled types of entities. The specific rules vary by country and by state or province. Some of these types are listed below, by country.

For guidance, approximate equivalents in the company law of English-speaking countries are given in most cases, for example:
private company limited by shares or Ltd. (UK, Ireland and the Commonwealth)
public limited company (UK, Ireland and the Commonwealth)
limited partnership
general partnership
chartered company
statutory corporation
state-owned enterprise
holding company
subsidiary company
sole proprietorship
charitable incorporated organisation (UK)
reciprocal inter-insurance exchange

However, the regulations governing particular types of entities, even those described as roughly equivalent, differ from jurisdiction to jurisdiction. When creating or restructuring a business, the legal responsibilities will depend on the type of business entity chosen.

European Union and European Economic Area
Decentralised EU/Euratom bodies established through secondary legislation
 Agencies, decentralised independent bodies, corporate bodies and joint undertakings of the European Union and the Euratom
Corporations and foundations registered at Union level (all are juridical persons):
European Research Infrastructure Consortium (ERIC)
European political party (Europarty)
European political foundation. (Eurofoundation)
Pan-European forms registered at member-state level 
corporations:
European grouping of territorial cooperation (EGTC)
Societas cooperativa Europaea (SCE): a European cooperative (Latin for "European Cooperative Society").
Societas Europaea (SE): a European (Public) Limited Company (Latin for "European Company").
other partnerships:
European economic interest grouping (EEIG): an EU legal entity designed to enable cross-border cooperation between companies. It has unlimited liability and is not liable for corporate tax.

Austria
Gen (Genossenschaft; types: Erwerbs- und Wirtschaftsgenossenschaft): ≈ cooperative
Privatstiftung: ≈ private foundation
Verein: ≈ nonprofit association
e.U. (eingetragenes Einzelunternehmen): ≈ sole trader (UK), sole proprietorship (US)
Kapitalgesellschaften: ≈ corporations (with juridical personality)
AG (Aktiengesellschaft): ≈ plc (UK). Minimum capital €70,000.
GmbH (Gesellschaft mit beschränkter Haftung): ≈ Ltd. (UK). Minimum capital €35,000.
 Sparkasse ≈ Mutual savings bank
Personengesellschaften: ≈ partnerships (without juridical personality)
non-registered and not considered legal entities:
stG (stille Gesellschaft): ≈ partnership by estoppel (i.e., no partnership agreement)
GesbR (Gesellschaft des bürgerlichen Rechts): ≈ partnership by contract (i.e., formed by partnership agreement); statutes and regulations concerning Austrian companies, especially with regards to the companies register (Firmenbuch), do not apply.
registered legal entities:
OG (offene Gesellschaft): ≈ general partnership
KG (Kommanditgesellschaft): ≈ limited partnership
GmbH & Co. KG: KG in which a GmbH is the general partner.
Obsolete:
Erwerbsgesellschaft: small-sized partnerships (not qualifying as OG or KG, respectively. Converted into OGs or KGs as of 1. 1. 2007)
OEG (Offene Erwerbsgesellschaft): small general partnership
KEG (Kommanditerwerbsgesellschaft): small limited partnership

See also help.gv.at (Austrian government site, in German)

Belgium
Dutch, French or German names may be used.

Following changes to the Code of Companies and Associations, the term "Private limited liability company" (BVBA/SPRL) automatically became "Private limited company" (BV/SRL), as a part of harmonising legal entity types within the European Union.

Bulgaria
AD / АД (aktsionerno druzhestvo / акционерно дружество): joint stock company ≈ plc (UK)
ADSITs / АДСИЦ (aktsionerno druzhestvo sus spetsialna investitsionna tsel / акционерно дружество със специална инвестиционна цел): real estate investment trust
EAD / ЕАД (ednolichno aktsionerno druzhestvo / еднолично акционерно дружество): type plc 
EOOD / ЕООД (ednolichno druzhestvo s ogranichena otgovornost / еднолично дружество с ограничена отговорност): type of OOD with a single member
ET / ЕТ (ednolichen turgovetz / едноличен търговец): sole proprietorship
OOD / ООД (druzhestvo s ogranichena otgovornost / дружество с ограничена отговорност): ≈ Ltd. (UK)
KD / КД (komanditno druzhestvo / командитно дружество): ≈ limited partnership
KDA / КДА (komanditno druzhestvo s aktzii / командитно дружество с акции): limited partnership with shares
SD / СД (subiratelno druzhestvo / събирателно дружество): ≈ general partnership, a legal entity

Croatia

Types of legal person business entities:
d.d. (dioničko društvo): ≈ plc (UK)  ≈ AG (Germany)
d.o.o. (društvo s ograničenom odgovornošću) is company with limited liability: ≈ Ltd. (UK) or LLC (US); minimum capital: kn 20,000
j.d.o.o. (jednostavno društvo s ograničenom odgovornošću): simple Ltd.; minimum capital: kn 10 (same liabilities as an Ltd., but has to set aside 25% of annual profit to collect enough equity capital to become a d.o.o.)
j.t.d. (javno trgovačko društvo): ≈ general partnership
k.d. (komanditno društvo): ≈ limited partnership
GIU (gospodarsko interesno udruženje): economic interest grouping
zadruga: cooperative

Types of natural person business entities:

obrt: ≈ sole proprietorship; several types: slobodni obrt (free proprietorship), vezani obrt (tied proprietorship), and povlašteni obrt (privileged proprietorship) registered according to profession where tied and privileged types are reserved only for master craftsmen): paušalni obrt (flat-rate proprietorship), obrt-dohodaš (income tax proprietorship), obrt-dobitaš (profits tax proprietorship); these are registered according to the type of taxation; first two are obligated to pay income tax and the last one is obligated to pay profits tax), sezonski obrt (seasonal proprietorship) that runs for a limited number of months during a year.
ortakluk: partnership of two or more sole proprietors
slobodna djelatnost: free profession; self-employment but only for certain types of professions: e.g. artists, journalists, lawyers, etc.; freelancing (similar to sole proprietors in their obligations)
domaća radinost and sporedno zanimanje: home business and side profession; limited forms of self-employment aimed at registering supplementary income from, say, small repairs or hobbies with yearly income limited to 10 average gross salaries (approx. EUR 11,700 in January 2020)
OPG (obiteljsko poljoprivredno gospodarstvo): family run agricultural business

Non-profit:
 udruga ≈ voluntary association; any form of free and voluntary association of natural or legal persons to accomplish a purpose without intent to acquire profit.

Cyprus

 Ιδιωτική Εταιρεία - LTD
 Δημόσια Εταιρεία - PLC
 Συνεργατικά Πιστωτικά Ιδρύματα - COOP
 Αυτοτελώς εργαζόμενος - SP
 Σωματεία και Ιδρυμάτα - SF
 Οντότητες που διέπονται από το δημόσιο δίκαιο - PUBLaw
 Ταμεία Προνοίας/ Συντάξεως - PF
 Άλλη νομική μορφή - OTH

Czechia
 a.s., akc. spol. (Akciová společnost): ≈ plc (UK). Minimum share capital CZK 2 000 000. Must have a supervisory board in addition to the management board.
 s.r.o., spol. s r.o. (Společnost s ručením omezeným): ≈ Ltd. (UK) Minimum share capital CZK 1
 v.o.s., veř. obch. spol., a. spol. (veřejná obchodní společnost): ≈ general partnership
 k.s., kom. spol. (komanditní společnost): ≈ limited partnership
 o.p.s. (obecně prospěšná společnost): ≈ One of the legal forms for non-governmental non-profit organizations
 živnost: ≈ Sole proprietorship
  s.p. (státní podnik): ≈ state enterprise
  příspěvková organizace: ≈ subsidized organization
 z.s. (zapsaný spolek): ≈ Voluntary association. Formerly o.s. (Občanské sdružení.)

Denmark
 Enkeltmandsvirksomhed: sole proprietorship
 Forening: ≈ association
 I/S (Interessentskab): ≈ general partnership.
 IVS (Iværksætterselskab): private limited company startup with limited equity capital. Must use 25% of profit to collect enough equity capital to become an ApS.
 ApS (Anpartsselskab): private limited company.
 A/S (Aktieselskab): public limited company.
 K/S (Kommanditselskab): limited partnership
 P/S (Partnerselskab or Kommanditaktieselskab): partnership limited by shares
 A.M.B.A. (Andelsselskab med begrænset ansvar): limited liability co-operative.
 F.M.B.A. (Forening med begrænset ansvar): limited liability voluntary association.
 S.M.B.A. (Selskab med begrænset ansvar): limited liability company.
 Partsrederi: A form of combined and continued ownership of a merchant vessel.
 Erhvervsdrivende fond: commercial foundation
 G/S (Gensidigt selskab): mutual organization

Estonia
FIE (Füüsilisest isikust ettevõtja): ≈ sole trader (UK), sole proprietorship (US)
Partnerships:
UÜ (Usaldusühing): ≈ limited partnership
TÜ (Täisühing): ≈ general partnership
Corporations:
OÜ (Osaühing): ≈ (Ltd.) private limited company (UK), (LLC) limited liability company (US)
AS (Aktsiaselts): ≈ (PLC) public limited company (UK), corporation (US)
Tulundusühistu: ≈ commercial association
MTÜ (Mittetulundusühing) ≈ nonprofit organization

Finland
General economic entities
Ay (avoin yhtiö): ≈ general partnership (use optional)
Ky (kommandiittiyhtiö, Kb): ≈ limited partnership
Oy (osakeyhtiö, Ab): ≈ Ltd. (UK). No minimum share capital as of 01.07.2019.
Oyj (julkinen osakeyhtiö, Abp): ≈ plc (UK)
osk (osuuskunta, Anl.): ≈ cooperative
T:mi (toiminimi), Yksityinen elinkeinonharjoittaja (/F:ma, enskild näringsidkare): sole proprietorship (use optional)

The abbreviations are usually in Finnish, but Swedish names may also be used either as is or in combination with Finnish, e.g. Oy Yritys Ab.
Non-profit entities
rekisteröity yhdistys, abbr. ry (abbr. rf): registered association, capable of acting as a legal person
rekisteröity puolue, abbr. rp ): registered political party
säätiö, abbr. rs: foundation
uskonnollinen yhdyskunta, religious community
voluntary associations chartered by statute law (e.g. Finnish Red Cross, National Defence Training Association of Finland, Finnish Bar Association)
For-profit entities of public law
valtion liikelaitos: commercial government agency, expected to fund themselves, but debts directly backed by state funds—distinguished from regular companies where the government owns stock. (See: List of Finnish government enterprises)
kunnallinen liikelaitos: municipal enterprise, similar as previous but run by a municipality
paliskunta: a reindeer herding corporation, governed like a stock company except that the "stocks" are reindeer
Economic entities for special purpose
asunto-osakeyhtiö, a limited liability company for the ownership, construction and maintenance of an apartment building
julkinen keskinäinen vakuutusyhtiö, abbreviated jy, public mutual insurance company
keskinäinen kiinteistöosakeyhtiö (a limited liability company for the ownership, maintenance and construction of real property.
keskinäinen vakuutusyhtiö, mutual insurance company
laivaisännistöyhtiö, a type of general partnership for the owning of a merchantman
säästöpankki, a type of loans and savings association
Real estate law corporations

In the corporations of real estate law, the ownership or membership may be vested either in the real property or in a legal or natural person, depending on the corporation type. In many cases, the membership or ownership of such corporation is obligatory for a person or property that fulfils the legal requirements for membership or wishes to engage in certain activities.
keskivedenkorkeuden muuttamista varten perustettu yhteisö, a corporation of water law for the permanent change of the median water level
ojitusyhteisö, a corporation of water law for the construction and maintenance of ditches
säännöstely-yhteisö, a corporation of water law for the regulation of water level in a body of water
tiekunta, a type of limited-liability corporation for the maintenance of private road
uittoyhteisö, a corporation of water law for timber-floating
vesioikeudellinen yhteisö, a corporation of water law for a project that involves economic use of bodies of water
yhteisalue, a corporation for the maintenance of a real property jointly used by several other properties or persons
yhteismetsä, a jointly owned forest
osakaskunta (historically "jakokunta"), a partition unit, i.e. a corporation for maintenance of the commons.

France
Micro-entreprise: special framework for minute businesses, a recent addition to French business law -with both revenue and pre-tax net income caps, of which Auto-entrepreneur (below) is a special case
Freelancers, individual independent contractors:
Auto-entrepreneur: ≈ self-employed (UK), independent contractor (US), a recent addition to French business law -with both a revenue cap and a specific set of derogatory income tax rates
Profession libérale: ≈ sole proprietorship such as a medical practice, an enduring entity stemming from the protected status designed for "liberal professions" with unlimited personal liability
: the incorporated equivalent of the latter, sole shareholder limited liability being key
EI (Entreprise individuelle/entreprise en nom personnel):
Investment funds/companies:
FCP (Fonds commun de placement): unincorporated investment fund
SICAF (Société d'investissement à capital fixe): ≈ investment trust (UK); closed-end fund (CEF), closed-end company (US); listed investment company (LIC) (Au)
SICAV (Société d'investissement à capital variable): ≈ investment company with variable capital (ICVC), open-ended investment company (OEIC) (UK); mutual fund, open-end company (US)
GIE (Groupement d'intérêt économique): economic interest grouping
Association: ≈ nonprofit association
Association non-déclarée: ≈ unincorporated association (UK)
Association déclarée: ≈ incorporated association (Au)
Partnerships (société de personnes):
SEP (Société en participation): ≈ equity partnership
 SPPL (Société en participation de professions libérales)
 Société en participation avec personne morale
 Société en participation entre personnes physiques
SNC (Société en nom collectif): ≈ general partnership (GP)
SCS (Société en commandite simple): ≈ limited partnership (LP)
SCA (Société en commandite par actions): ≈ publicly traded partnership (PTP) (US)
SCI (Société Civile Immobilière): ≈ French property company (SCI)
Corporations (société de capitaux):
share companies (both partnership and company)
SARL, SàRL (Société à responsabilité limitée): ≈ private limited company (Ltd.) (UK), limited liability company (US)
EURL (Entreprise unipersonnelle à responsabilité limitée): ≈ single shareholder limited company (SME Pvt) (UK)
stock companies (société par actions)
SA (Société anonyme): ≈ public limited company (plc) (UK), Inc. (US/Can)
SCOP (Société coopérative de production): ≈ cooperative corporation (Can)
SEM (Société d'économie mixte): ≈ government-owned corporation
SAS (Société par actions simplifiée): ≈ limited liability company (US, especially in Delaware), unlisted public company (Au), close corporation (CC) (S. Africa), private corporation (Can); often used for subsidiaries; minimum of one director and two members/shareholders; no limit on share capital; liability can be restricted to director; no "one share – one vote" principle
 (U- unipersonnelle): limited liability, sole shareholder Ltd. company (UK) or single member close corporation

Germany
 individuals
Einzelunternehmen: individual entrepreneur ≈ sole trader (UK), sole proprietorship; only professional services, agriculture and forestry as well as small commercial businesses
Eingetragener Kaufmann (male/both genders)/eingetragene Kauffrau (female) (e.K./e.Kfm./e.Kfr.): registered merchant ≈ sole trader (UK), sole proprietorship (US); individual entrepreneur with commercial business (Handelsgewerbe)
 partnerships (Personengesellschaften )
 (GbR), BGB-Gesellschaft: simple partnership; no minimum capital, two or more partners, unlimited liability of partners, no commercial business (Handelsgewerbe) that is not small. 
nicht-eingetragener Verein: non-registered association; non-commercial/idealistic purposes only; similar to e.V. but lacking juridical personality 
commercial partnerships (Personenhandelsgesellschaften)
Offene Handelsgesellschaft (OHG): literally "open business company" ≈ general partnership: no minimum capital, unlimited liability of partners; GbR with commercial business (Handelsgewerbe)
Kommanditgesellschaft (KG) ≈ limited partnership
In case the general partner is a limited company, the legal form of the general partner, followed by "& Compagnie" (shortened to & Co.), must be included in the name of the company, resulting in combined legal forms such as:
GmbH & Co. KG: the general partner is a GmbH
AG & Co. KG: the general partner is an AG
SE & Co. KG: the general partner is a societas Europaea
GmbH & Co. OHG: each of the general partners are a GmbH
The same rule also applies when the general partner is a limited company incorporated outside Germany, for example:
Limited & Co. KG: the general partner is a UK private company limited by shares
PLC & Co. KG: the general partner is a UK plc
ApS & Co. KG: the general partner is a Danish Anpartsselskab
LLC & Co. KG: the general partner is a US LLC
Note that when a KG's general partner is a limited company, the resulting form is legally considered as a different subtype of KG
Partnerschaftsgesellschaft (PartG): partnership company; only for professional services
Partnerschaftsgesellschaft mit beschränkter Berufshaftung (PartGmbBH): partnership company with limited professional liability ≈ limited liability partnership (US); only for professional services
Partenreederei: combined and continued ownership of a single merchant vessel; no longer available for new businesses since 24 April 2013.
corporations (Körperschaften)
eingetragener Verein (e.V.): incorporated association; non-commercial/idealistic purposes only, commercial business cannot be the main purpose of the e.V.
altrechtlicher Verein/rechtsfähiger Verein (r.V.): association established before 1 January 1900; extremely rare
wirtschaftlicher Verein: commercial purpose, established by public grant; rare
Companies limited by shares (equity) (Kapitalgesellschaften)
Kommanditgesellschaft auf Aktien (KGaA): ≈ publicly traded partnership (US); although it is a company limited by shares, the KGaA has at least one general partner whose liability is not limited
As with the KG, the legal form of the general partner, followed by "& Compagnie" (shortened to & Co.), must be included if it is another limited company, resulting in combined legal forms such as:
GmbH & Co. KGaA: the general partner is a GmbH
AG & Co. KGaA: the general partner is an AG
SE & Co. KGaA: the general partner is a societas Europaea
Note that when a KGaA's general partner is a limited company, the resulting form is legally considered as a different subtype of KGaA
Gesellschaft mit beschränkter Haftung (GmbH): company with limited liability ≈ private limited company (Ltd.) (UK), limited liability company (LLC) (US); at least one shareholder; minimum equity €25,000.
The "mit beschränkter Haftung (mbH)" suffix ("with limited liability") is sometimes added to the name of a firm that already ends in "-gesellschaft" ("company"), e.g., "Mustermann Dental-Handelsgesellschaft mit beschränkter Haftung" ("dental trading company with limited liability"), which would be abbreviated as "Mustermann Dental-Handelsgesellschaft mbH".
 (gGmbH); In German tax law, the non-profit GmbH is a limited liability company whose income is used for charitable purposes.
Unternehmergesellschaft (haftungsbeschränkt) (UG (haftungsbeschränkt)): literally "entrepreneurship company (with limited liability)": identical to GmbH but with a minimum capital of €1 (times the number of shares); part of earnings needs to remain in the company to reach a minimum equity of €25,000; the word haftungsbeschränkt ("with limited liability") may not be abbreviated.
Aktiengesellschaft (AG): literally "stock company" ≈ public limited company (plc) (UK), Inc. (US); minimum capital €50,000.
eingetragene Genossenschaft (e.G.): registered cooperative
Körperschaft des öffentlichen Rechts: corporation under public law; main purpose is non-commercial, part of public administration 
others
Stiftung ≈ (private) foundation, trust
Stiftung des öffentlichen Rechts: foundation under public law; main purpose is non-commercial, part of public administration 
Anstalt des öffentlichen Rechts: institution under public law; main purpose is non-commercial, part of public administration

Greece
A.E. (Anónimi Etaireía / Ανώνυμη Εταιρεία, Α.E.): ≈ plc (UK), minimum capital €24,000
 A.V.E.E. (Anónimi Viomichanikí Emborikí Etaireía / Ανώνυμη Βιομηχανική Εμπορική Εταιρεία, Α.Β.Ε.Ε.)
E.E. (Eterórrithmi Etaireía / Ετερόρρυθμη Εταιρία, Ε.Ε.): limited partnership
E.P.E. (Etaireía Periorisménis Efthínis / Εταιρεία Περιορισμένης Ευθύνης, Ε.Π.Ε.): ≈ Ltd. (UK), no minimum capital
 M.E.P.E. (Monoprósopi Etaireía Periorisménis Efthínis / Μονοπρόσωπη Ε.Π.Ε., Μ.Ε.Π.Ε.): type of E.P.E. with a single member
O.E. (Omórrithmi Etaireía / Ομόρρυθμη Εταιρεία, Ο.Ε.): general partnership
 O.V.E.E. (Omórrithmi Viomichanikí Emborikí Etaireía / Ομόρρυθμη Βιομηχανική Εμπορική Εταιρεία, Ο.Β.Ε.Ε.)
I.K.E. (Idiotiki Kefalaiouchiki Etaireía / Ιδιωτική Κεφαλαιουχική Εταιρεία) = Private Company, minimum capital=€0. The shares do not take the form just of capital but also warranties, labor offer etc. This form is a composite form between A.E. E.P.E and O.E. which is greatly affected by the Articles of Incorporation.
atomikís epicheírisis / ατομικής επιχείρησης: sole proprietorship

At most times usually companies would translate any of these designations into the French translation société anonyme or S.A. in non-Greek languages.

Hungary
In Hungary, business entities are mainly regulated by the Companies Act of 2006, the Companies Registration Act of 2006 and the new Civil Code of 2013. All companies are required to indicate their type in their name.

Iceland

Ireland
The situation in Ireland is similar to the United Kingdom below, though without the class Community Interest Company. There were two forms of Company Limited by Guarantee, but only the form without a share capital is now used. Irish names may also be used, such as cpt for plc, and Teo (Teoranta) for Ltd.
Limited Company – Four types:
Private company limited by shares – If company is wound up, members' liability is limited to the amount, if any, unpaid on the shares they hold. Maximum number of members in the Republic of Ireland is 99.
Company limited by guarantee not having a share capital – Public company. Must have at least seven members. Members' liability limited to amount they have undertaken to contribute to company assets. If wound up, liability does not exceed amount specified in memorandum. If a guarantee company does not have a share capital, members are not required to buy shares (such as charities).
Company limited by guarantee having a share capital – As with a private company if the maximum number of members is 99. Members have liability either for the amount, if any, that is unpaid on the shares they hold, or for the amount they have undertaken to contribute to company assets, in the event that it is wound up.
A public limited company. Must have at least seven members. Liability is limited to the amount, if any, unpaid on shares they hold. Unlawful to issue any form of prospectus except in compliance with the Companies Acts 1963–2006. Nominal value of Company's allotted share capital must satisfy specified minimums which must be fully paid before company commences business or exercises any borrowing powers.
Single Member Company – Private company limited by shares or a guarantee company having a share capital, which is incorporated with one member, or whose membership is reduced to one person. Must have at least two directors and one secretary. Sole member can dispense with holding General Meetings including Annual General Meetings.
Unlimited Company – No limit on liability of members. Creditors may have recourse to shareholders for unpaid liabilities of the company. Must have at least two shareholders.
Undertakings for Collective Investment in Transferable Securities (UCITS) – Public limited companies formed under EU Regulation and the Companies Acts 1963–2006. Sole object of a UCIT is collective investment in transferable securities of capital raised from the public that operates on the principle of risk-spreading. Central Bank of Ireland must approve all registrations of UCITS.
A designated activity company (Irish: Cuideachta Ghníomhaíochta Ainmnithe) or DAC is a form of company in Ireland created by the Companies Act 2014.  Like a limited company, designated activity companies have limited liability. Additionally, they may only carry out activities listed in their constitution documents, and so the concept of ultra vires continues to apply to them.
 Irish Section 110 Special Purpose Vehicle (SPV)

Italy
 (Individuals):
 (Chief)
 (Artisan)
 (Independent worker) 
 (Professional)
 ≈ sole trader (UK), sole proprietorship (US)
 (Partnerships):
S.s.: ≈ general partnership (non commercial)
S.n.c.: ≈ general partnership (commercial)
S.a.s.: ≈ limited partnership
 (Corporations):
S.p.a.: ≈ plc (UK), corporation (US)
S.a.p.a.: ≈ publicly traded partnership
S.c.p.a.
S.c.a.r.l.
S.r.l.: ≈ Ltd. (UK), LLC (US)
S.r.l.s.:
 (Cooperatives):
S.c.r.l. cooperative limited (liability) company

Latvia
SIA (Sabiedrība ar ierobežotu atbildību): ≈ Ltd. (UK)
AS (Akciju sabiedrība): ≈ plc (UK)
IK (Individuālais komersants): ≈ sole proprietorship
PS (Pilnsabiedrība) ≈ general partnership, joint venture
KS (Komandītsabiedrība): ≈ limited partnership
ĀKF (Ārzemju komersanta filiāle): branch of a foreign enterprise
BO (Bezpeļņas organizācija): ≈ nonprofit organization
VSIA (Valsts sabiedrība ar ierobežotu atbildību): ≈ state-owned Ltd.

Liechtenstein
AG: Aktiengesellschaft
GmbH: Gesellschaft mit beschränkter Haftung

Lithuania
UAB (Uždaroji akcinė bendrovė): ≈ Ltd. (UK)
AB (Akcinė bendrovė): ≈ plc (UK)
VšĮ (Viešoji įstaiga): ≈ non-profit organization
IĮ (Individuali įmonė): ≈ personal enterprise
Individuali veikla = sole proprietorship (does not possess legal personality of its own)
TŪB (Tikroji ūkinė bendrija): ≈ general partnership
KŪB (Komanditinė ūkinė bendrija): ≈ limited partnership
MB (Mažoji bendrija) : ≈ Limited liability partnership
BĮ (Biudžetinė įstaiga): ≈ Budgetary institution
PP (Politinė partija) : ≈ Political Party

Luxembourg
S.A. (Société anonyme): ≈ plc (UK)
S.A R.L. (Société à responsabilité limitée): ≈ Ltd. (UK)
Société à responsabilité limitée simplifiée (SARL-S) = simplified limited liability company
Société en commandite simple (SCS): ≈ limited partnership
Société en Commandite Spéciale (SCSp): unlike an SCS, an SCSp does not have a legal personality separate from those of its partners; it is formed by an agreement among its partners and allows for more flexible structuring, not having to comply with corporate law requirements
Société en commandite par actions (SCA): ≈ corporate limited partnership

Malta
Ltd: Limited liability company
Plc: Public limited liability company

The Netherlands
All non-governmental legal entities are registered on the companies register of the chamber of commerce.
Stichting: ≈ foundation. Can run a business. No profit distribution to founders or board members.
mutual societies (associations which are allowed to pay dividends to their members; liability may be unlimited (W.A. – wettelijke aansprakelijkheid), limited (B.A. – beperkte aansprakelijkheid) or exempt (U.A. – uitsluiting van aansprakelijkheid)):
Coöperatie: ≈ co-operative society
Onderlinge waarborgmaatschappij: ≈ mutual insurance company
Vereniging ≈ association. Can run a business, but may not distribute profit among its members.
 vve (Vereniging van Eigenaars) ≈ Homeowner association 
Mts (Maatschap): ≈ group practice (of professionals, e.g. doctors, accountants, lawyers); share facilities not profits, members are treated as natural persons for tax and liability purposes.
Eenmanszaak: ≈ sole trader (UK), sole proprietorship (US)
vof (vennootschap onder firma): ≈ GP
cv (commanditaire vennootschap): ≈ LP
bv (besloten vennootschap): ≈ Ltd. (UK), LLC (US). Shares are privately registered and not freely transferable. The name means "closed company", stemming from the fact that the (group of) shareholder(s) cannot be changed without consent from the majority of shareholder(s).
nv (naamloze vennootschap): ≈ plc (UK), Corp. (US). Minimum issued share capital upon incorporation: €45,000. Literally translated, the title is "nameless company", owing to the fact that shareholders are not formally known as such in company statutes and other legal documents.

Norway
ASA (Allmennaksjeselskap): ≈ plc (UK). Minimum capital NKr 1,000,000
AS (Aksjeselskap): ≈ Ltd. (UK). Minimum capital NKr 30,000.
ANS (Ansvarlig selskap): general partnership with mutual liability
BA (Selskap med begrenset ansvar): cooperatives and companies created by legislation
BL (Borettslag): housing share company
DA (Selskap med delt ansvar): general partnership with apportioned liability
Enkeltpersonforetak: sole proprietorship
Etat: state, county or municipal agency
FKF (Fylkeskommunalt foretak): county enterprise
HF (helseforetak): subsidiary health enterprise
IKS (Interkommunalt selskap): inter-municipal enterprise (owners' liability)
KF (Kommunalt foretak): municipal enterprise (owner's liability)
KS (Kommandittselskap): ≈ limited partnership
NUF (Norskregistrert utenlandsk foretak): foreign enterprise registered in Norway
RHF (regionalt helseforetak): regional health enterprise
SF (Statsforetak): state enterprise
Sparebank: savings bank
Stiftelse: a foundation, with capital but without members or shareholders. It is allowed to make a profit, but is more suited for non-commercial purposes.
UB (Ungdomsbedrift): youth enterprise, only used in education

Poland
No universal definitions of company and business exist in the Polish law. 
The usage of the equivalent terms in the Polish legal system may often be confusing because each of them has several different definitions for various purposes.

Przedsiębiorca ('entrepreneur' or 'undertaking')—known as kupiec ('merchant') until 1964; jednostka gospodarcza ('economic unit') from 1964 to 1988; podmiot gospodarczy ('economic entity') from 1988 to 1997—is the closest equivalent of company understood as an entity. As of January 2021, there are at least thirteen different definitions of entrepreneur/undertaking, enshrined in the following acts:
 the Civil Code,
 the Law of the Entrepreneurs,
 the Bankruptcy and Restructuring Law,
 the Law of Industrial Property Rights,
 the Geological and Mining Law
 Act on the National Court Register,
 Act on Protection of Competition and Consumers,
 Act on Combatting Unfair Competition,
 Act on Counteracting Unfair Market Practices,
 Act on Informing about Prices of Goods and Services,
 Act on Protection of Classified Information,
 Commission Regulation (EU) on the application of Articles 107 and 108 of the Treaty on the Functioning of the European Union to de minimis aid,
 Regulation (EU) No 952/2013 of the European Parliament and of the Council of 9 October 2013 laying down the Union Customs Code.

Przedsiębiorstwo ('enterprise') is defined in the Civil Code as an organized complex of material and non-material components designated to perform economic activity. Therefore, it is equivalent to company understood as a set of assets organized to do business.

Działalność gospodarcza ('economic activity') is the closest equivalent of business. As of January 2021, there are at least six different definitions of economic activiy, enshrined in the following acts:
 the Law of the Entrepreneurs,
 the Tax Ordinance, 
 Act on Personal Income Tax,
 Act on Goods and Services Tax (VAT),
 Act on Social Security System,
 Act on Procedures Concerning Public Aid (transcription of the definition developed in the EU case law).

Entities registered as entrepreneurs in the Central Registration and Information on Business (Centralna Ewidencja i Informacja o Działalności Gospodarczej, CEIDG)
przedsiębiorca będący osobą fizyczną (an entrepreneur who is a natural person), previously known as osoba fizyczna wykonującą działalność gospodarczą or działalność gospodarcza osoby fizycznej or jednoosobowa działalność gospodarcza or kupiec jednoosobowy — sole proprietorship; the company's name must include the first name and surname of the entrepreneur;
s.c. (spółka cywilna): "civil law partnership", itself neither a proper legal entity nor a juridical person, as it is the partners (natural persons) who retain their separate statuses as entrepreneurs and legal entities, albeit bound by an agreement on the sharing of profits, losses and ownership of a business (common pool of assets). Although it is granted NIP and REGON numbers distinct from those belonging to the partners, its legal capacity is limited exclusively to matters related to value-added tax, excise and customs duties, as well as the roles of an employer in labor law contracts and a payer for its employees (but not partners) of their personal income tax advances, social insurance contributions and health insurance contributions. Can be likened to a voluntary association. Its name must include the first names and surnames of the entrepreneurs;

Entities registered in the National Court Register (Krajowy Rejestr Sądowy, KRS)

Entities registered as entrepreneurs in the Register of Entrepreneurs (Rejestr przedsiębiorców), excluding the pan-EU forms 
Except for the spółki osobowe (partnerships), all are juridical persons.
spółki handlowe commercial/trade partnerships and companies/corporations
spółki osobowe partnerships (entities lacking juridical personality)
sp.j. (spółka jawna): ≈ registered partnership, otherwise translated general partnership
sp.p. (spółka partnerska): ≈ professional partnership, otherwise translated limited liability partnership May also be denoted by the addition of i partner(zy) ("and partner(s)") to the firm's name. Can only be used for the purpose of practicing as a professional licensed by a regulatory body, in a profession listed in the appropriate provision of the Commercial Companies Code (e.g. physicians, barristers). The partners are fully liable for the partnership's debts, with the exception of debts incurred by other partners practicing their licensed profession and employees under their direction.
sp.k. (spółka komandytowa): ≈ limited partnership
S.K.A. (spółka komandytowo-akcyjna): limited joint-stock partnership, otherwise translated partnership limited by shares. Minimum share capital zl 50,000 (approx. €12,500).
spółki kapitałowe companies/corporations
S.A. (spółka akcyjna): ≈ joint-stock company, otherwise translated plc (UK). Minimum share capital zl 100,000 (approx. €25,000).
P.S.A. (prosta spółka akcyjna) = simple joint-stock company, otherwise translated simple plc, a new company type 2021, actually a simplified version of the former type
Sp. z o.o. (spółka z ograniczoną odpowiedzialnością): ≈ Ltd. (UK). Minimum share capital zl 5,000 (approx. €1,250)
spółdzielnia: ≈ cooperative. May also be denoted by the adjective Spółdzielczy(-a/-e) in the firm's name. Some subtypes of cooperatives are governed by additional dedicated laws along the general cooperative law, these include spółdzielcza kasa oszczędnościowo-kredytowa (a credit union), bank spółdzielczy (a cooperative bank), spółdzielnia mieszkaniowa (a housing cooperative), rolnicza spółdzielnia produkcyjna (an agricultural production cooperative), spółdzielnia kółek rolniczych (a farming societies cooperative, providing agricultural services), and spółdzielnia pracy (a labor cooperative), including spółdzielnia socjalna (a social cooperative).
p.p. (przedsiębiorstwo państwowe): state undertakings or state enterprise 
instytut badawczy: (government research institute, excluding those operated by the Polish Academy of Sciences), 
instytut Sieci Badawczej Łukasiewicz (Łukasiewicz Research Network institute) 
przedsiębiorstwo zagraniczne (foreign undertaking), 
towarzystwo ubezpieczeń wzajemnych (mutual insurance society), 
towarzystwo reasekuracji wzajemnej (mutual reinsurance society)
 branches of foreign undertakings active on the territory of Poland, 
main branches of foreign insurance undertakings, 
main branches of foreign reinsurance undertakings
as well as any of the juridical persons registered in the Register of Associations, Other Social and Professional Organizations, Foundations and Independent Public Healthcare Institutions (see below) if they intend to perform business activities (when allowed by their bylaws, excluding Independent Public Healthcare Institutions, as they are not allowed to register as an entrepreneur, as well as excluding those of juridical persons or other legal entities who are registered in the KRS exclusively for the purpose of obtaining status of an officially recognized charity – public benefit organization, and would otherwise be exempt from the registration in the KRS – see below)

Entities registered in the Register of Associations, Other Social and Professional Organizations, Foundations and Independent Public Healthcare Institutions (Rejestr stowarzyszeń, innych organizacji społecznych i zawodowych, fundacji oraz samodzielnych publicznych zakładów opieki zdrowotnej)

All the following types are juridical persons:
 (foundation); Polish law currently envisages only public purpose foundations
stowarzyszenie rejestrowe (registered association) 
związek stowarzyszeń (union of associations), 
territorial branches of an association who have their own juridical personality (if allowed by the association's bylaws), 
stowarzyszenie ogrodowe family garden association 
związek stowarzyszeń ogrodowych (union of family garden associations), 
stowarzyszenie kultury fizycznej (physical culture association) 
związek sportowy (sport union = a union of physical culture associations), 
polski związek sportowy (Polish sport union), a sui generis juridical person holding the authority of the officially recognized national sports governing body in disciplines which are managed by an IOC-recognized international federation (all Olympic and some established non-Olympic disciplines, but not the Paralympic ones, the latter obligated to operate under the general rules as unions of associations because of their non-commercial and often charitable character); each discipline is always governed by one such body only though some of the latter cover multiple disciplines; this highly regulated legal form may be described as based on a union of associations entrusted with the status of a national sports governing body on behalf of the respective international federation and the state authorities, thus exhibiting also some features of an official authority, but also of a company, as it is designated by law as the obligatory owner and trader of exclusive rights related to sponsorship, advertisement and broadcasting of national events and national team, and therefore, it is indirectly obligated (in practice in all cases) to register also as an entrepreneur; its incorporation is possible only through transforming an existing union of associations whose direct membership is composed exclusively of sports clubs active in a specific sport, as well as their subnational unions, or other juridical persons active in the particular discipline, and following the mandatory prior admission of such Union to the respective international federation, and subsequently, the mandatory consent of the minister responsible for sports before applying to the KRS; registration is synonymous with official recognition as the national governing body of a discipline and is coupled with a number of additional rights and obligations 
związek zawodowy (trade union) as well as their federations and confederations, as well as territorial branches of a trade union who have their own juridical personality if allowed by the trade union's bylaws), 
organizations of employers (and their unions, federations and confederations), 
organizations of economic self government (chambers of industry and commerce, Polish Chamber of Commerce, guilds and chambers of craft, Polish Union of Craft, and chambers of agriculture), 
organizations of professional self government of certain entrepreneurs (trade and services unions for entrepreneurs active in trade, gastronomy or services, excluding those acknowledged as craft or those exercising a profession governed by a regulatory college; transportation unions for entrepreneurs active in transportation; federations of the former two), 
various types of agricultural unions (trade unions of individual farmers, farming societies and their unions, sectoral agricultural organisations and their unions)
samodzielny publiczny zakład opieki zdrowotnej (independent public healthcare institution) – a sui generis type of juridical persons, mandatory for the majority of public healthcare entities (hospitals, clinics etc.) established by the State Treasury, a territorial self-government unit, or a public higher education institution, except for entities operating as a trade partnership (a limited liability company or a joint-stock company, whose absolute majority of shares or stocks is held by the State Treasury, a territorial self government unit or a public higher education institution), or those operating as a budgetary unit, on behalf either of the State Treasury (including centers for forensic psychiatry, units of the State Sanitary Inspection, as well as some of the healthcare entities operated by a uniformed service, and a few addiction treatment centers and nursing homes operated directly by the Ministry of Health, mainly due to historical reasons) or of a self-government unit (all voivodeship centres for occupational medicine, a dozen communal rehabilitation centers or nursing homes, and three communal GP clinics).

In addition, any juridical persons or other legal entities (including those originally or otherwise exempt from the registration in the KRS – see below) also have to register, if they apply for and obtain the status of an officially recognized charity (organizacja pożytku publicznego = public benefit organization), when eligible; however, as an exception, registration solely for that purpose neither confers juridical personality to entities lacking one, nor does it create obligation or right to register as an entrepreneur.

Entities excluded from registration as entrepreneurs 

Types of entities excluded from registration as entrepreneurs include the following.

Natural persons
Działalność pozarejestrowa osoby fizycznej (non-registered activity of a natural person): unless explicitly stated in a sector-specific particular act, unregulated activity of a natural person is not considered “fully fledged” economic activity, thus being entitled to exemption from registration in the CEIDG, if the person has not performed business activities during the preceding 60 months and the monthly gross income generated by the activity does not exceed 50% of the minimum wage. Such activity is also free from the obligation to pay social insurance contributions, nevertheless, it is still subject to taxation and health insuranće contributions. Individual prostitution is in all cases excluded from registration, unregulated, untaxed and not subject to compulsory social or health insurance, whereas organised prostitution is illegal.
Kancelaria komornicza (an office of a judicial enforcement officer commonly known as bailiff) – a court bailiff is a public official (but not a civil servant) who is assigned to undertake enforcement action within the area of the jurisdiction of a single regional court; it is an individual who is appointed to act as such by the minister of justice on application of the person concerned, filed via the intermediary of the president of the court of appeal, within whose area the candidate intends to perform acts in enforcement proceedings. Before appointing, the minister of justice shall request the council of the chamber of the court bailiffs to give the opinion of the candidate. A bailiffs is not employed by the court in spite of acting on behalf of its authority, but is self-employed and operates an own single chancellery (named Bailiff's Office of the Regional Court in...), a quasi-undertaking excluded from registration as an entrepreneur in CEIDG, but treated as such for most other purposes, including income taxation or social and health insurance, obligated to obtain NIP and REGON numbers by registering in the respective registers, and is remunerated by percentage on money recovered and the other fees specified in The Court Bailiffs and Enforcement Act of 20 August 1997. The bailiff also incurs expenses, to be covered by the debtor or by the creditor if the enforcement proceedings are ineffective.
Biuro poselskie, senatorskie lub posła do Parlamentu Europejskiego (a constituency office of a Sejm deputy, a senator, or a member of European Parliament) –  it is the elected official himself who personally acts as the employer of staff in the office, he/she uses own PESEL number instead of obtaining NIP for the purposes of paying employees′ income tax or health and social insurance contributions, but is obligated to obtain a REGON number for the office; the office is financed exclusively from funds assigned by the chancellery of the respective parliamentary chamber and may not perform economic activity 
Gospodarstwo rolne rolnika indywidualnego (agricultural holding of an individual farmer): proper agricultural activity of an individual farmer  animal husbandry; inland fisheries; plant production, including crop cultivation, vegetable farming, horticulture, orchard farming, fungiculture, seed production, plant nursery, forestry) is excluded from registration as entrepreneur (but a farmer is still obligated to obtain NIP and REGON numbers by registering in the respective registers, as well as to obtain in most cases registration in the Register of Producers, Agricultural Holdings and Applications for Payment Entitlements, the latter being obligatory for all holders of pigs, cattle, goats or sheep, and a prerequisite to receive any public state or EU funding). Proper agricultural activity is exempt from income and real estate taxes, being subject to much more lenient agricultural tax instead. Such farmer is obligated to pay agricultural social and health insurance contributions subsidized by the state, instead of paying much higher regular social and health insurance contributions. A farmer may also produce certain amount of liquid biofuels for own use, after registering in a dedicated Register of Farmers Producing Biofuels for Their Own Use, and in the Central Register of Excise Entities as a (token amount) excise taxpayer, but without the obligation to register as VAT taxpayer. Certain other types of individual farmer's economic activities performed on a limited scale (agri-tourism, direct-to-consumer sales of own products at the farm or at marketplaces, winemaking out of own crops) may also be performed without registering as an entrepreneur, unless he/she decides otherwise, and unless such income does not exceed certain limits; such farmer may also retain the right to participate in the preferentiaL agricultural social insurance system if he has been covered by it for at least three years preceding initiation of an additional activity and intends to continue proper agricultural production; however, land and buildings used for such additional activities are subject to standard real estate tax, instead of agricultural tax;
 in case of agri-tourism or direct-to-consumer sales of own products at the farm or at marketplaces, the farmer may remain exempt from income tax and may choose whether or not to become a VAT taxpayer; in the case of agri-tourism, a limit of five rooms is also applicable; 
 in the case of winemaking, the production is subject to income tax, VAT and excise (albeit at preferential rates); an annual production volume quota of 10000 liters is also applicable);
 Jednostka systemu oświaty prowadzona przez osobę fizyczną (a school or an educational institution other than a higher education institution, operated by a natural person)

Juridical persons and other collective legal entities, excluding the pan-EU forms 
Certain types of juridical persons or other collective legal entities which have been established otherwise than by registration in the KRS, may in few situations be authorized by law to perform business activity (sometimes of a limited scope and/or scale, along with their main, often non-commercial or not-for-profit activity), despite remaining excluded and exempt from the obligation to register in the KRS, but are still obligated (except for the State Treasury as a whole) to obtain NIP and REGON numbers by registering in the relevant registers, and are usually still subject to the general taxation rules (including VAT); examples of such situations include:
spółka wodna (a water corporation) – a not-for-profit water law corporation and a juridical person, incorporated to provide water services to its shareholders, usually in a rural or suburban setting, registered by the local starosta, while a union of such entities is registered by the voivode;
związek wałowy (a levee union) – a similar not-for-profit corporation and a juridical person, incorporated to construct and manage a levee, registered by the local starosta, while a union of such entities is registered by the voivode;
spółka dla zagospodarowania wspólnoty gruntowej (a common land management corporation) – a similar not-for-profit corporation and a juridical person, incorporated to manage common land, registered by the local starosta
 fundacja rodzinna (a family foundation)
koło łowieckie (a hunting club) – a juridical person incorporated by its members to manage game on a certain territory (hunting circuit) leased from the state, legally allowed to perform business activities related to its statutory tasks; according to the Act on Hunting Law, it acquires juridical personality through registration by the respective district board of the Polski Związek Łowiecki (Polish Hunting Association, itself also a juridical person and a quango, actually a modified, highly regulated union of associations exempt from registration in the KRS)
koło gospodyń wiejskich (a rural women's association) and their unions – in accord with a dedicated act, they acquire juridical personality by registering in the National Register of the Rural Women's Associations maintained by the Agency for Modernisation and Restructuring of Agriculture 
uczelnia (a higher education institution, regardless whether public or private) – may perform business activity organized as a separate part of its own juridical personality (or as a separate juridical person e.g. a limited liability partnership or a joint-stock partnership). According to the Act on Law on Higher Education and Science, a private institution may only be founded by a natural person or by a juridical person (other than a state or a self-governmental juridical person); it comes into existence through registration by the Minister of Science and Higher Education and acquires its own juridical personality which is distinct from the founding entity's one; however, a slightly different procedure concerns the private ecclesiastical institutions which acquire juridical personality    in the same way as other juridical persons created by a church or an other confessional community (see below) but require the Ministry's approval to award state-recognised diplomas. On the other hand, a public institution is established through an act of Parliament or by a regulation of the Minister of Science and Higher Education, and therefore, its existence as a legal person does not depend on registration anywhere;
osoby prawne i jednostki organizacyjne nieposiadające osobowości prawnej utworzone przez kościół lub inną wspólnotę wyznaniową (juridical persons or legal entities lacking juridical personality which have been created by a church or an other confessional community recognized by the state) – they are established and (in the case of juridical persons) acquire juridical personality through a regulation of the minister competent for religious confessions, or (in the case of territorial or personal institutions of the Catholic Church in Poland) by notifying the Polish government by the relevant church authority, that an ecclesiastical juridical person (such as a parish or a diocese) or other legal entity has been established in accord with the canon law; such entities may be allowed to perform business activities by their bylaws, and are registered by the Ministry of Interior and Administration in the detailed part of the Register of Churches and Other Confessional Communities; exceptions include religious foundations and religious associations of lay people, both subject to standard KRS registration under general rules, albeit with some oversight authority awarded to a church or an other confessional community;
instytut naukowy Polskiej Akademii Nauk (a research institute of the Polish Academy of Sciences) – created as a juridical person by registration in the dedicated register maintained by the academy (itself also a juridical person and a quango – a regulated body combining features of a learned society with a statutory membership cap, a regulatory college and a corporation, itself also exempt from registration in the KRS),
partia polityczna (a political party) – it is created and becomes a juridical person through registration on the List of Political Parties. The list is not a part of the KRS and it is maintained by the District Court in Warsaw. Political parties in Poland are generally banned from performing economic activities; they may, however, perform certain minor activities, such as minor office services, selling promotional items with party logo, selling publications concerning its manifesto, its political agenda, its bylaws and its activities. 
fundusz emerytalny (a pension fund) – either otwarty fundusz emerytalny (open pension fund), pracowniczy fundusz emerytalny (employees' pension fund) or dobrowolny fundusz emerytalny (voluntary pension fund) – it is created on permission of the Polish Financial Supervision Authority and becomes a juridical person through registration in the Register of Pension Funds. The register is not a part of the KRS and it is maintained by the District Court in Warsaw.
 fundusz inwestycyjny (an investment fund) – either fundusz inwestycyjny otwarty (open investment fund), specjalistyczny fundusz inwestycyjny otwarty (specialist open investment fund), or fundusz inwestycyjny zamknięty (closed investment fund); it is created on permission of the Polish Financial Supervision Authority and becomes a juridical person through registration in the Register of Investment Funds. The register is not a part of the KRS and it is maintained by the District Court in Warsaw.
jednostka doradztwa rolniczego (a farm advice unit) – a state juridical person established by the act on farm advice units
wojewódzki ośrodek ruchu drogowego (a voivodeship centre for road traffic) – a juridical person subordinate to the self-government of a voivodeship, responsible for conducting tests for driving licenses in all categories, tests for special traffic qualifications, as well as for traffic safety education and promotion; they are legally permitted to conduct not-for-profit economic activity;
park narodowy (a national park) — a state juridical person established by a regulation of the Council of Ministers, authorized by law to perform economic activity, unless it contravenes the Act on the Conservation of Nature,
wspólnota mieszkaniowa (a homeowner community) – a legal entity lacking juridical personality or a dedicated register, established ipso iure without any registration procedures in buildings or building complexes with at least one separate owner-occupancy delimited; such a community is required to obtain NIP and REGON and to maintain simplified accounting documentation and a bank account; also subject to company income tax, in contrast to the real estate tax which is paid directly by its members; may perform activities outside the scope of its obligatory core responsibilities, including activities related to lending out parts of common areas of the real estate, or parts of advertising-suitable surfaces such as siding or fencing, becoming in such situations a VAT taxpayer; a community in a building or a building complex with four or more separate owner-occupancies delimited is required to elect a managing board, or to select and contract a professional real-estate manager;
wspólnota gruntowa (a common land community) – a similar legal entity lacking juridical personality or a dedicated register, established ipso iure for the management of common land, unless a dedicated common land management partnership (a juridical person) has been incorporated instead (see above);
publiczna jednostka systemu oświaty (a public school or educational institution other than a higher education institution) – a legal entity lacking juridical personality, established and registered by an organ of the government or a territorial self-government unit
stowarzyszenie zwykłe (a common/simple/ordinary association) – registered by the local starosta, a legal entity lacking juridical personality, less formalized compared to a registered association (which is a juridical person registered in the KRS)
uczniowski klub sportowy (a schoolchildren's sport club) and inny niż uczniowski klub sportowy działający w formie stowarzyszenia, którego statut nie przewiduje prowadzenia działalności gospodarczej (sport club other than a schoolchildren's sport club which operates as an association whose bylaws do not foresee economic activity) – both are technically associations registered by a local starosta instead of the KRS, but nevertheless acquire as an exception juridical personality, though are not authorized to undertake economic activity
samorząd zawodu zaufania publicznego (a regulatory college), a public-law corporation constituting the self-governmental regulatory body for a certain profession (designated in such case a public confidence profession) or their pair with membership mandatory for every professional, established in each case through an act of Parliament, depending on profession either as a single one-tier national body or as a two-tier system of a number of territorial bodies united in a national body
państwowa lub samorządowa instytucja kultury (a state or a (territorial) self-governmental cultural institution) – a juridical person such as a museum, a theatre, a musical theatre, a ballet, an opera house, a philharmonica, a cameral or a symphony orchestra, a folk song and dance ensemble, an art gallery or a public library (created and registered by a minister or a territorial self-government unit) – even though the main (cultural/artistic) activity of a public cultural institution is not legally regarded as business activity, an institution may be allowed to perform additional business activity, if its bylaws state so;
jednostka samorządu terytorialnego: gmina, powiat, województwo (a territorial self-government unit: municipality=gmina, county=powiat), province=voivodeship) – a juridical person established by a regulation or (in the case of voivodeship) by an act of Parliament;
związek międzygminny, powiatów lub powiatowo-gminny (an inter-municipal union, a union of counties, or a municipal-county union) – juridical person registered by the Minister of the Interior, incorporated to carry out specific services on behalf of member municipalities and/or counties);   
bank państwowy (a state bank) – established as a juridical person by a regulation of the Council of Ministers (in the interwar period, by the President of the Republic; dominant type of banks during the times of communism; nowadays, this status is restricted to national development banks; only one exists as of 1 December 2020; the Bank Gospodarstwa Krajowego;
Narodowy Bank Polski (National Bank of Poland) (established by the Constitution of Poland, granted juridical personality by the Act governing it)
 kluby i koła – caucuses in the Sejm and the Senate (called clubs when grouping ≥15 members or circles if grouping 3–14 members) – legally they are quangos, entities lacking juridical personality, operating on behalf of the State Treasury, but may enter into work contracts as an employer, sue and be sued in a labour court, and are obligated to obtain NIP and REGON numbers by registering in the relevant registers
 kluby i koła poselskie – clubs and circles of (Sejm) deputies
 kluby i koła senatorskie – clubs and circles of senators
 kluby i koła parlamentarne – parliamentary (joint cross-chamber) clubs and circles – of both (Sejm) deputies and senators
selected other state juridical persons e.g. civilian technical inspection units (Office of Technical Inspection, Transportation Technical Supervision), Polish Waters National Water Management Holding; Polish Air Navigation Agency, National Health Fund, Social Insurance Institution, State Fund for Rehabilitation of Disabled Persons, National Fund of Environment Protection and voivodeship funds for environment protection, Polish Film Institute.
selected state (statio fisci) or self-governmental legal entities other than legal persons: budgetary units: e.g. State Forests National Forest Holding, Agricultural Social Insurance Fund, statistical offices and the Central Statistical Office, units of various state uniformed services, state inspections and their laboratories – operating on behalf of the State Treasury or the parent territorial self-government unit;
Skarb Państwa (the State Treasury) – the juridical person impersonating the state and its government apparatus (with some exceptions enumerated above), established by the Civil Code; itself, it is not assigned  NIP and REGON numbers, as they are assigned to its organizational units (statio fisci)

Some of the abovementioned types of entities (e.g. hunting clubs, church entities), other than the state or self-governmental ones, may nevertheless be subject to registration in the KRS exclusively for the purpose of official recognition as a charity (public benefit organization – see above), if they are eligible for, apply for and obtain such.

Portugal
Cooperativa ≈ cooperative: The name of the entity should include the expression "Cooperativa" or "União de Cooperativas" or "Federação de Cooperativas" or "Confederação de Cooperativas" 
 CRL (Cooperativa de Responsabilidade Limitada): limited liability cooperative
S.A. (Sociedade Anónima): ≈ plc (UK), and these are further classified as:
S.A., Sociedade Aberta: ≈ publicly traded corporation (literally "open company").
S.F., Sociedade Fechada: ≈ privately held (closely held) corporation (literally "closed company")
Lda. (Limitada): ≈ Ltd. (UK), and these might be:
Unipessoal Lda.: single member company (literally: "Unipersonal Ltd.")
SGPS (Sociedade Gestora de Participações Sociais): holding company (literally "shareholding management company")
SUA (Sociedade Unipessoal Anónima): ≈ Sole Proprietorship
 Self-managed collective investment companies 
SGOIC (Sociedades Gestoras de Organismos de Investimento Coletivo) = Self-managed collective investment management companies 
SIC (Sociedades de Investimento Coletivo) = self-managed collective investment companies

RomaniaSocietăți comerciale, abbreviated SC (Companies): Societăți de persoane (Unincorporated companies, also called Partnerships)
 Societatea în nume colectiv, abbreviated SNC (General Partnership, abbreviated GP)
 Societatea în comandită simplă, abbreviated SCS (Limited Partnership, abbreviated LP)
 Societăți de capitaluri (Incorporated companies, also called Corporations)
 Societatea în comandită pe acțiuni, abbreviated SCA (Company Limited by Shares)
 Societatea pe acțiuni, abbreviated SA (Joint-Stock Company)
 Societăți hibride (Hybrid companies)
 Societate cu răspundere limitată, abbreviated SRL (Limited Liability Company)
 Societatea cu răspundere limitată cu proprietar unic, abbreviated SRL cu proprietar unic

 S.A. (Societate pe Acţiuni): ≈ plc (UK)
 S.C.A. (societate în comandită pe acţiuni): limited partnership with shares
 S.C.S. (societate în comandită simplă): ≈ limited partnership
 S.N.C. (societate în nume colectiv): ≈ general partnership
 S.R.L. (societate cu răspundere limitată): ≈ Ltd. (UK)
 PFA (persoana fizica autorizata): ≈ self-employed (UK) Sole Proprietorship (US)
 O.N.G. (Organizație Non-Guvernamentală): ≈ Non-state pension fund (literally: Non-Governmental Organization) — strictly speaking, ONGs do not exist in Romanian law, they are legally called either associations or foundations. Political parties, trade unions and religious denominations/churches/temples/synagogues/mosques aren't considered ONGs. And "privately managed pension funds" (legal term) are another matter than ONGs.
limited liability company "societate cu raspundere limitata" (SRL);
joint stock company "societate pe actiuni" (SA);

Slovakia
a.s. (Akciová spoločnosť): ≈ plc (UK). Minimum share capital €25,000. Must have a supervisory board in addition to the management board.
s.r.o., spol. s r.o. (Spoločnosť s ručením obmedzeným): ≈ Ltd. (UK)
k.s. (Komanditná spoločnosť): ≈ LLP. or Limited liability partnership (UK). Must have at least one "general partner" with unlimited liability.
v.o.s. (Verejná obchodná spoločnosť): ≈ general partnership or unlimited partnership
družstvo: ≈ Cooperative
živnosť: ≈ Sole proprietorship

Slovenia
d.d. (Delniška družba): ≈ plc (UK)
d.o.o. (Družba z omejeno odgovornostjo): ≈ Ltd. (UK)
d.n.o. (Družba z neomejeno odgovornostjo): ≈ Unlimited company (UK)
k.d. (Komanditna družba): ≈ LP (UK)
s.p. (Samostojni podjetnik): ≈ Sole proprietorship (UK)

Spain
C.B. Comunidad de Bienes (partnership)
S.A. (Sociedad Anónima): ≈ plc (UK), minimum capital €60,101.21
S.L. (Sociedad Limitada): ≈ Ltd. (UK), minimum capital €3,012
S.L.N.E. (Sociedad Limitada Nueva Empresa): similar to S.L., it was introduced in 2003 to speed up new company registration (registration can be completed in one day), minimum capital €3,012
S.A.D. (Sociedad Anónima Deportiva): a limited liability sports corporation
S.L.L. (Sociedad Limitada Laboral): a labour limited corporation
S.C. (Sociedad Colectiva): roughly a general partnership
S.C.P. (Sociedad Civil Privada): ¿?
S.Cra. (Sociedad Comanditaria): roughly a limited partnership
S.Com. p. A. (Sociedad Comanditaria por Acciones)
S.Com p.A.P. (Sociedad Comanditaria por Acciones Profesional)
S.Coop. (Sociedad Cooperativa): a cooperative that typically is owned and democratically controlled by its workers
Other initialisations are used for cooperatives; Sociedad Anónima Laboral (SAL); some are region specific e.g. Sociedad Cooperativa Catalana Limitada (SCCL)
 UTE ≈ temporary consortium or joint venture
 Venture capital fund:
SCR (Sociedades de Capital Riesgo)
FCR (Fondos de Capital Riesgo), FCR-Pyme for SME
SICC (Sociedades de inversión colectiva de tipo cerrado)
FICC (Fondos de inversión colectiva de tipo cerrado)
SGEIC (Sociedades Gestoras de Entidades de Inversión Colectiva de tipo cerrado)

Sweden
Aktiebolag – AB: private limited company ≈ Ltd. (UK). Minimum capital SKr 25,000.
Publikt aktiebolag – AB (publ): public limited company ≈ plc (UK). Minimum capital SKr 500,000.
Bankaktiebolag: joint-stock bank company
Försäkringsaktiebolag: joint-stock insurance company
Tjänstepensionsaktiebolag: joint-stock occupational pension company
Ekonomisk förening – Ek. för.: economic association (minimum three members) ≈ cooperative
Bostadsrättsförening: condominium/home-owners' association
Kooperativ hyresrättsförening: home-renters' association
Bostadsförening: apartment-owners' association (established before 1930)
Sambruksförening: cooperative farming or gardening association
Försäkringsförening: insurance association
Enskild näringsidkare (a.k.a. enskild firma): sole trader
Handelsbolag – HB: trading partnership
Kommanditbolag – KB: limited partnership
Enkelt bolag: regulated partnership between two parts (companies or private persons)
Ideell förening: non-profit organization
Samfällighetsförening: community association
Stiftelse: foundation, has capital or property but no members or owners (shareholders)
Trossamfund: religious organisation
Filial: foreign branch
Bankfilial: foreign bank branch
Försäkringsfilial: foreign insurance branch
Sparbank: savings bank
Medlemsbank: credit union
Ömsesidigt försäkringsbolag: mutual insurance company
Ömsesidigt tjänstepensionsbolag: mutual occupational pension company
Tjänstepensionsförening: occupational pension association

Albania
 Foreign and domestic investors have a range of opportunities to organize their business in Albania. They can either establish and register a business organization or establish and register a branch or representative office. The registration of foreign entities, since 1 September 2007, had been carried out at the National Registration Center, which aimed to implement the "one stop shop" system. Law No. 131/2015 dated 26 November 2015 made possible the creation of the National Business Center (QKB), whose purpose was to simplify the procedures of doing business in the country by enabling registration and licensing procedures in a single institution. As a result, the National Registration Center and the National Licensing Center were abolished.

Sh.p.k. (Shoqëri me përgjegjësi të kufizuar): ≈ Ltd. (UK); a business entity established by one or several natural or legal persons;
Sh.A. (Shoqëri Aksionere): ≈ PLC (UK); a company whose capital is divided into shares signed by its founders;
Sh.K. (Shoqëri komandite): ≈ limited partnership; the liability of at least one partner is limited to the value of their contribution;
Shoqëri kolektive: ≈ general partnership; the liability of the company's partners before its creditors is unlimited;
Degë: ≈ subsidiary; entities created by a parent company that carry the same legal presence as the company;
Zyrë e përfaqësimit: ≈ representative office; business offices where a company's activities can operate from that are not intended to generate revenue.

Argentina

S.A.S (Sociedades de Acciones Simplificadas)
S.A. (Sociedad Anónima): ≈ plc (UK)
S.R.L. (Sociedad de Responsabilidad Limitada): ≈ Ltd. (UK): ≈ limited liability company (USA)
S.C.S. (Sociedad en Comandita Simple): ≈ limited partnership
S.C.p.A. (Sociedad en Comandita por Acciones): limited partnership with shares
Soc.Col. (Sociedad Colectiva): ≈ general partnership (USA)
S.C.e I. (Sociedad de Capital e Industria)
S.E. (Sociedad del Estado): ≈ state-owned enterprise
S.G.R. (Sociedad de Garantía Reciproca)
S.A.S. (Sociedad por Acciones Simplificada)
S.A.U. (Sociedad Anónima Unipersonal): ≈ Sole proprietorship

Australia
LLP (Limited liability partnership): partnerships are governed on a state-by-state basis in Australia. In Queensland, a limited liability partnership is composed of at least one general partner and one limited partner. It is thus similar to what is called a limited partnership in many countries.
ILP (Incorporated limited partnership): used for venture capital investments comes in four types: Venture Capital Limited Partnership (VCLP), Early-stage Venture Capital Limited Partnership (ESCVLP), Australian Venture Capital Fund of Funds (AFOF), Venture Capital Management Partnership (VCMP).

Inc. (Incorporated): restricted to non-profit associations
Ltd. (Limited): ≈ plc (UK). The suffix Ltd. may also be used by a private company limited by guarantee, such as a charity or university (these may obtain dispensation from the Registrar of Companies to operate without the suffix).
NL (No liability): A type of mining, speculative, or research company with no right to call up the unpaid issue price of shares.
Pty. Ltd. (Proprietary Limited Company): ≈ Ltd. (UK) ATF Trust. In Australia companies can act as a trustee for a trust.
Pty. (Unlimited Proprietary) company with a share capital: A company, similar to its limited company (Ltd., or Pty. Ltd.) counterpart, but where the liability of the members or shareholders is not limited.
 Trust
 Indigenous Corporation under the Corporations (Aboriginal and Torres Strait Islander) Act 2006 ("CATSI Act"), administrated by the Office of the Registrar of Indigenous Corporations

Belarus

Bosnia and Herzegovina
d.d. (dioničko društvo): ≈ plc (UK) ≈ AG (Germany)
a.d. (akcionarsko društvo): ≈ plc (UK) ≈ AG (Germany)
d.n.o. (društvo s neograničenom solidarnom odgovornošću): ≈ general partnership
d.o.o. (društvo s ograničenom odgovornošću): ≈ Ltd. (UK) ≈ GmbH (Germany)
k.d. (komanditno društvo): ≈ limited partnership
s.p. (samostalni preduzetnik): ≈ Sole proprietorship (UK)

Brazil
Sociedade limitada (Ltda.): ≈ Ltd. (UK)
S.A. (Sociedade anônima): ≈ plc (UK)
Sociedade simples: ≈ PLLC
Sociedade em comandita simples: ≈ ordinary limited partnership
Sociedade em nome coletivo: ≈ general partnership
Sociedade em conta de participação: ≈ general partnership
Sociedade em comum: ≈ general partnership
Cooperativa ≈ cooperative
Empresa individual (firma individual): ≈ individual proprietorship / sole proprietorship
Empresa Individual de Responsabilidade Limitada (EIRELI): Same as Ltd., but without partners.
Micro empreendedor individual: ≈ individual enterprise
Empresa pública: ≈ Government-owned corporation
Sociedade de economia mista: ≈ Government-owned corporation
Associação em sentido estrito (sem finalidade lucrativa): ≈ nonprofit association
Organização não governamental: ≈ nonprofit association
Organização da sociedade civil de interesse público: ≈ nonprofit association
Organização social: ≈ nonprofit association
Serviços sociais autônomos: ≈ nonprofit association
Fundação privada: ≈ private foundation
Fundação pública: ≈ public foundation

Brunei
There are three main types of business entity in Brunei, namely sole proprietorship, partnership and company.

A private company contains the term "Sendirian Berhad", meaning "Private Limited" or "Sdn. Bhd." as part of its name; for a public company "Berhad" or "Bhd." is used.

Cambodia
SP (Sole Proprietorship)
GP (General Partnership)
LP (Limited Partnership)
SM Pte Ltd. (Single Member Private Limited Company):
Pte Ltd. (Private Limited Company): ≈ [private limited company (Ltd.)] (UK)
Plc Ltd. (Public Limited Company): ≈ plc (UK)
PEEC (Public Establishment with Economic characteristics)
State Company: ≈ plc
State Joint Venture Company: ≈ plc
Import Export Co., Ltd

Canada
In Canada entities can be incorporated under either federal or provincial (or territorial) law.

The word or expression "Limited", Limitée, "Incorporated", Incorporée, "Corporation" or Société par actions de régime fédéral or the corresponding abbreviation "Ltd.", Ltée, "Inc.", "Corp." or S.A.R.F. forms part of the name of every entity incorporated under the Canada Business Corporations Act (R.S., 1985, c. C-44). ≈ Ltd. or Plc (UK)

As an exception, entities registered prior to 1985 may continue to be designated Société commerciale canadienne or by the abbreviation S.C.C.

Under the Canada Cooperatives Act (1998, c. 1), a co-operative must have the word "cooperative", "co-operative", "coop", "co-op", coopérative, "united" or "pool", or another grammatical form of any of those words, as part of its name.

Unlike in many other Western countries, Canadian businesses generally only have one form of incorporation available. Unlimited liability corporations can be formed in Alberta "AULC", British Columbia "BCULC" and Nova Scotia "NSULC". The aforementioned unlimited liability corporations are generally not used as operating business structures, but are instead used to create favorable tax positions for either Americans investing in Canada or vice versa. For U.S. tax purposes the ULC is classified as a disregarded entity.

Rather, Canadian businesses are generally formed under one of the following structures:
SP (Sole Proprietorship): No formal business structure is established
GP (General Partnership): Either a formal structure with a partnership agreement, or an informal structure, in which case the Partnerships Act for the province will apply
LP (Limited Partnership): An investment structure, limiting both the liability and the participation of the investor. An investor who takes an active role will be deemed a general partner, and become exposed to unlimited liability.
Corporation
Joint Venture: A business activity shared by two or more business entities. The joint venture's activities must be finite in terms of either time or scope.

Chile
SpA (Sociedad por acciones): Disregarded entity with shares (sole shareholder)
SRL (Sociedad de Responsabilidad Limitdada) – LLC (Partnership) US purposes
EIRL (Empresa Individual de Responsabilidad Limitada): individual enterprise with limited liability
S.A. (Sociedad Anónima): ≈ plc (UK)
 S.G.R. (Sociedad de Garantia Reciproca)
LTDA. (Sociedad de responsabilidad limitada): ≈ Ltd. (UK)

China
Companies include two types,
 Company with limited liability,: ≈ Ltd. (UK). 
 Corporation, corporated company, : ≈ plc (UK), joint-stock company, corporation.
Other than companies, ordinary firms include other two types: (See also Partnership (China))
 Sole trader 
 Partnership

Colombia
 S.A. (Sociedad Anónima): ≈ plc (UK), Corporation (US)
 S.A.S. (Sociedades por Acciones Simplificada): Similar to the French S.A.S (societé par actions simplifiée)
 Ltda. (Sociedad de Responsabilidad Limitada): ≈ Ltd. (UK), LLC (US)
 S.C. (Sociedad Colectiva): General partnership
 S. en C. (Comandita Simple): Limited partnership
 S.C.A. (Comandita por Acciones): Publicly traded partnership
 E.U. (Empresa Unipersonal): Sole proprietorship

Costa Rica
 S.A. (Sociedad Anónima): ≈ plc (UK), Corporation (US)
 S.R.L. or Ltda. (Sociedad de Responsabilidad Limitada): ≈ Ltd. (UK), LLC (US)

Dominican Republic
C. por A. (Compañía por Acciones), also abbreviated CXA
S.A. (Sociedad Anónima): ≈ public limited company
S.A.S (Sociedad Anónima Simplificada): ≈ [(Simplified public limited company)]
SRL. (Sociedad de Resposabilidad Limitada): ≈ Limited Liability Company
EIRL. (Empresa Individual de Responsabilidad Limitada): ≈ [(Sole proprietor Limited Liability Company)]
Sociedad En Comandita Simple.

Ecuador
S.A. or C.A. (Sociedad Anónima): ≈ public limited company
S.A.S. (Sociedad por Acciones Simplificada): public limited company
Cía. Ltda. (Compañía Limitada): ≈ Limited Liability Company
EP (Empresa Pública): Legal entity owned by the Government.

Egypt
SAE (Sharikat al-Mossahamah) ≈ plc (UK). Minimum capital 
LLC (Limited Liability Company) ≈ Ltd. (UK). No Minimum capital .
Sharikat Tadamun ≈ شركة تضامن general partnership
Sharikat Tawssiyah Bassita ≈ شركات توصية بسيطة limited partnership
Sharikat Tawssiyah Belashom ≈ LLP

Ethiopia 
 PLC (Private limited company Amharic ሃላፊነቱ የተወሰነ የግል ማህበር)
 SC (Share company Amharic አክሲዩን ማህበር)
 CS (Cooperative societies Amharic ህብረት ስራ ማህበራት)
 PE or PC (public enterprises or public corporations Amharic የመንግስት ልማት ድርጅቶች or ኮርፖሬሽን)

Ghana

 Sole Proprietorship
 Private Limited By Share
 Private Unlimited By Share
 Private Limited By Guarantee
 Public Unlimited Company
 External Company
 Public Limited Company
 Public Limited By Guarantee
 Partnership
 Subsidiary Business Name

Guatemala

Haiti
Standardized Company; Legal Form, Sociedad Anónima (SA) – Stock Corporation; Minimum Capital Requirement, G 25,000

Hong Kong
Ltd (Limited/有限公司): may denote either a private or public company limited by shares, or a company limited by guarantee. Under the Companies Ordinance, the name of a Hong Kong incorporated company may be registered in English, Chinese, or both.
 Unltd or Ultd (Unlimited/無限公司): similar to a limited liability company (Ltd) but whose members or shareholders do not benefit from limited liability should the company ever go into formal liquidation. It is not a requirement under company law to add or state the word or designation Unlimited (無限公司) or its abbreviations (Unltd or Ultd) at the ending of its legal company name, and most unlimited companies do not.

India

Sole Proprietorship – Sole Proprietorship firm is the simplest form of business entity in India that is owned and managed by a single person. It is the easiest way of registering and starting a business. It is not governed by any law and hence it is the easiest form of business in India. All the decisions and management of the business are in the hands of one person. Documents required for the registration of a sole proprietorship in India are Aadhar card, PAN card, bank account and a proof of registered office.
Partnership – liability is joint and unlimited. Registration is not compulsory and can be done through the registrar of firms. Active partners take part in day-to-day operations of the business, in addition to investing in it. Active partners are entitled to a share of the enterprise's profits. Sleeping partners invest in the business and are entitled to a share of its profits, but do not participate in day-to-day operations.
Limited Liability Partnership – Liability is limited and similar to Partnership except for registration is mandatory and liability is limited. At least two partners are 'designated partner' (equivalent to directors in the company), who manages day-to-day working. Regulated by the union government.
Company
Private Limited Company: have 2–200 shareholders; shares are held privately and cannot be offered to the public. Have limited liability and registration is mandatory. Regulated by the union government.
Public Limited Company: have more than 200 shareholders. Can be listed or unlisted in the share market.
One-person company – It is a type of private company which can have only one director and member.
Unlimited Company – A company, similar to its limited company (Ltd, or Pvt Ltd) counterpart, but where the liability of the members or shareholders is not limited.
Public sector undertaking (PSU) – Alternatively known as Public Sector Enterprise (PSE). It may be a public limited company listed on stock exchanges with a major ownership by a state government, central government, or local government, or it may be an unlisted entity with a major ownership by a state government, central Government, or local government. Some of these entities are formed as business entities through special legislation, where these entities are governed by the statutes of this legislation and may or may not be governed by company laws like a typical business entity.
 Cooperative Societies
 E.g. Gujarat Co-operative Milk Marketing Federation Ltd. (GCMMF) owner of Amul brand.
 NGO – A non-governmental organization (NGO), Section 8 company, or a non-profit company is a citizen-led organization that functions separately from the government, usually to advance some social cause.

Indonesia
Most of the legal entity types are regulated in a modified version of the original version of the Dutch Burgerlijk Wetboek.

Yayasan: foundation
UD: sole proprietorship (lit. "trade company").
 Sometimes this kind of legal entity is called a perusahaan dagang or abbreviated as PD, which sometimes makes confusion with the former name for municipally-owned statutory corporations, Perusahaan Daerah, also abbreviated as PD (today they are called Perusahaan Umum Daerah ("regional public corporations") and abbreviated as Perumda)
vof/Fa, known locally as just firma: general partnership
Koperasi: Cooperative
mts (maatschap): ≈ group practice (of professionals, e.g. doctors, accountants, lawyers); share facilities not profits, members are treated as natural persons for tax and liability purposes.
cv ≈ LP (US), Kommanditgesellschaft (Germany); a more common type for smaller businesses
PT: ≈ private company limited by shares (UK)
State-owned PT (both in majority and complete ownership) ends with "(Persero)".

Iran
: ≈ plc (UK), public
: ≈ plc (UK), private
: ≈ Ltd. (UK)
: ≈ limited partnership
: mixed joint-stock partnership
: ≈ general partnership
: proportional liability partnership
: production and consumption cooperative

Israel
Company (khevra, חברה) – for-profit entity which may engage in any lawful activity. Most companies limit the liability of their shareholders. In that case, the phrase "Limited" or the abbreviation "Ltd." must appear as part of the full name of the company. The term "B.M."/"BM" (בע"מ), literally: by limited liability/warranty, is usually translated as "Ltd." in English and pronounced "ba'AM" in Hebrew. Companies are governed by the Companies Act, 5759-1999 (חוק החברות, תשנ"ט-1999). Few sections are still in force from the Companies Ordinance [New Form], 5743-1983 (פקודת החברות [נוסח חדש], תשמ"ג-1983).
Private company – any company which is not a public company.
Public company – any company whose shares are listed on an exchange or have been offered to the public, and are held by the public.
Charity company (khevra le'to'ellet ha'tzibur, חברה לתועלת הציבור) – company generally governed by the Companies Act, except it is a nonprofit. A charity company must have pre-defined goals, rather than engage in any lawful activity. Some provisions in the Companies Act apply specifically to charity companies. The letters "CC" (חל"צ) must be appended to such company's name.
Partnership (shutafut, שותפות) – created by default, even without registration, when two or more persons run a business together for profit. Personal liability of partners is not limited, unless they are limited partners of a limited partnership. Partnerships are governed by the Partnerships Ordinance [New Form], 5735-1975 (פקודת השותפויות [נוסח חדש], תשל"ה-1975).
Cooperative (aguda shitufit, אגודה שיתופית) – entity which may pursue profit, but with certain legal properties meant to facilitate greater participation by each shareholder, or member, in the entity's affairs. Shareholders usually have an additional relationship with the cooperative, such as employees or consumers. This type of entity is found mainly in agriculture (a kibbutz or moshav is often a cooperative), transportation, or certain types of marketing operations associated with agricultural products. Cooperatives are governed by the Cooperatives Ordinance (פקודת האגודות השיתופיות).
Voluntary association (amuta, עמותה) – nonprofit entity, which must have its goals defined in its founding agreement. Includes, among others, academic institutions, hospitals and various charitable organizations. Voluntary associations are governed by the Voluntary Associations Act, 5740-1980 (חוק העמותות, תש"מ-1980).

Japan
Business corporations are referred to as kaisha (会社) and are formed under the Companies Act of 2005. There are currently (2015) 4 types and each of them has legal personality:
株式会社 (kabushiki gaisha or kabushiki kaisha, "K.K." (usually translated in company names as "Company, Limited"/"Co., Ltd.")) – lit. "stock company", the most typical form of business corporation.
合同会社 (gōdō gaisha or gōdō kaisha, "G.K.") – lit. "amalgamated company", a close corporation form similar to the American LLC, introduced in 2006
有限会社 (yūgen gaisha or yūgen kaisha, "Y.K.") – lit. "limited company", a close corporation form for smaller businesses, abolished in 2006 and replaced by G.K. above
合名会社 (gōmei gaisha or gōmei kaisha, "GMK") – corporation similar to a general partnership
合資会社 (gōshi gaisha or gōshi kaisha, "GSK") – corporation similar to a limited partnership
Partnerships are referred to as kumiai (組合). Each of these 4 types has no legal personality though other corporations, which include "kumiai" in their name, have:
任意組合 (nin'i kumiai, "NK") – general partnership (Civil Code)
匿名組合 (tokumei kumiai, "TK") – anonymous partnership, an investment bilateral contract (Commercial Code, Book 2 Ch.4 Article 535 et seq)
投資事業有限責任組合 (tōshi jigyō yūgen sekinin kumiai) – limited partnership for investment (Limited Partnership for Investment Act 1998, Rev.2004)
有限責任事業組合 (yūgen sekinin jigyō kumiai) – similar to a Limited Liability Partnership (Limited Liability Partnership Act of 2005)

Jordan
Partnership (General Partnership Company).
Limited Liability (Limited Liability Company).
Limited Liability in Shares (Limited Liability in Shares).
Public Shareholding (Public listed stock company).
Private Shareholding Companies (Private listed stock company).
Foreign Company (Non-Jordanian company operating in Jordan).

Kazakhstan
АО (Aktsionernoe obschestvo/): Joint stock company
ТОО (Tovarishchestvo s ogranichennoy otvetstvennostyu/): limited liability partnership
TDO/ТДО (Tovarishchestvo s dopolnitelnoyu otvetstvennostyu/Товарищество с дополнительной ответственностью) Additional liability partnership
GP/ГП (Gosudarstvenoe predpriyatie/): State company
КТ (Komanditnoe Tovarishchestvo; Командитное товарищество)
ОО (Obshestvennoe Obedinenie / Общественное объединение) Social association
PT/ПТ (Polnoe Tovarishchestvo / Полное товарищество) Full partnership
PtK/ПтК (Potrebibitelskii Kooperativ / Потребительский кооператив)
PrK/ПрК (Proizvodstvenni Kooperativ / Производственный кооператив)
РО (Relitioznoe Obedinenie / Религиозное объединение)
Uchr/Учр (Uchrezhdenie/Учреждение)

Korea, South
Company: In Korean Commercial Act, a company is a corporation established for commercial activities or other for-profit purposes. A company comes into existence by registering its incorporation at the location of its head office.
 : gōmei gaisha (Japan); corporation similar to a general partnership
 : gōshi gaisha (Japan); corporation similar to a limited partnership
 : limited liability company; ≈ gōdō gaisha (Japan)
 ((주) or ㈜ for short) : ≈ kabushiki gaisha (Japan); plc (UK)
 : ≈ yūgen gaisha/gōdō gaisha (Japan); Ltd. (UK); GmbH (Germany)
Cooperative: In Korean Framework Act On Cooperatives, a cooperative is a business organization that seeks to improve the rights and interests of its members and contribute to the local community by engaging in cooperative purchasing, production, sales, and provision of goods or services. Cooperatives cannot engage in finance or insurance business.

 : It is an federation established to promote the common interests of cooperatives..

Kosovo 
 Individual Business (B.I.)
 General Partnership (O.P.)
 Partnership (SH.K.M.)
 Limited Liabilities Companies (SH.P.K. Limited Liability)
 Joint Stock Companies (J.S.C., SH.A.)
 Foreign Company ("DEGA NË KOSOVË", "KOSOVO BRANCH")
 Socially owned enterprises
 Public enterprises
 Agricultural cooperatives

Lebanon
s.a.l. (Societe Anonyme Libanaise): a form of a joint stock company
S.A.R.L. (Société à responsabilité limitée): a form of a Limited Liability Company
Partnership
 S.N.C.(Société en Nom Collectif): General partnership 
 S.C.S.(Société en Commandite Simple): Partnership in commendam
Holding Company
Offshore companyRR
Branch of Foreign Company
Representative Office

Malaysia
PLT (Perkongsian Liabiliti Terhad): ≈ LLP
Bhd. (Berhad): ≈ plc (UK)
Sdn. Bhd. (Sendirian Berhad): ≈ Ltd. (UK)

Mexico

Business entities according to the "Ley General de Sociedades Mercantiles" (General Law of Business entities)
Persona Física
S.A. (Sociedad Anónima): ≈ plc (UK)
S. de R.L.(Sociedad de Responsabilidad Limitada): ≈ Ltd. (UK)
Associates name and "y compañía" or Associates name and "y sucesores"(Sociedad en Nombre Colectivo): ≈ general partnership
S. en C. (Sociedad en Comandita Simple): ≈ limited partnership
S. en C. por A. (Sociedad en Comandita por Acciones): ≈ master limited partnership

Note: Any of these entities can be incorporated as a "Capital Variable" entity, in which case has to add the "de C.V." sufix to its company name. Example: "S.A. de C.V.", "S. de R.L. de C.V."

Business entities according to the "Ley del Mercado de Valores" (Stock Market Law)
S.A.B. (Sociedad Anónima Bursátil)
S.A.P.I. (Sociedad Anónima Promotora de Inversión)

Monaco
SAM (Société Anonyme Monégasque): ≈ joint stock company
SARL (Société à Responsabilité Limitée): ≈ Ltd. (UK), LLC (USA)
SNC (Societe en Nom Collectif): ≈ General Partnership
SCS (Societe En Commandite Simple): ≈ Limited Partnership
SCA (Société en Commandite par Actions): ≈ Limited Partnership with Shares
Sole Trader

Mongolia

Montenegro
Preduzetnik        (Preduzetnik):                         ≈ Sole proprietorship (UK)                                 ≈ Einzelunternehmen/Eingetragener Kaufmann (D)
O.D. (Ortačko Društvo):                     ≈ General partnership (UK)                                 ≈ Offene Handelsgesellschaft ≈ OHG (D)
K.D. (Komanditno Društvo):                  ≈ Limited partnership (UK)                                 ≈ KG (D)
A.D. (Akcionarsko Društvo):                 ≈ joint-stock company, plc (UK) ≈ AG (D)
D.O.O. (Društvo sa Ograničenom Odgovornošću): ≈ Private Limited Companies (Ltd.) (UK)                        ≈ GmbH (D)
Dio stranog društva (Dio stranog društva): 
Literally part of a foreign company this sort of business entity contains the original name, legal organizational form from origin country which is converted in
one of above mentioned form (Preduzetnik; O.D.; K.D.; A.D.; D.O.O.), as such it is registered in the Central Register of Companies. This form is a little bit specific and was created for companies that are domiciled registered in other countries and have its part in Montenegro.

Morocco
S.A (Société Anonyme): ≈ Public Limited Company (P.L.C) (UK), Corporation (US/Can) 
S.A.S (Société Anonyme Simplifiée): ≈ Unlisted public company (Au), Close Corporation (CC) (S. Africa), Private Corporation (Can); often used for subsidiaries; minimum of one director and two members/shareholders; no limit on share capital; liability can be restricted to director; no "one share – one vote" principle
S.A.R.L (Société à Responsabilité Limitée): ≈ Private Limited company (Ltd.) (UK), Limited Liability Company (US)
G.I.E (Groupement d'Intérêt Economique): economic interest grouping
S.N.C (Société en Nom Collectif): ≈ General Partnership (GP)
S.C.S (Société en Commandite Simple): ≈ Limited Partnership (LP)
S.C.A (Société en Commandite par Actions): ≈ Publicly Traded Partnership (PTP) (US)

Namibia
Close Corporation*
Companies (Private, Public and Section 21)*
Sole Trader*
Partnership*
Trusts*
Co-operatives*

Nepal
Private Limited Company: Liability, limited by shares; Name, cannot be deceptively similar to another registered company; Management, at least 1 director; Shareholders, limited to 1–50 excluding persons who are employed by company, prohibition against any invitation to the public to subscribe for shares; Founders, 1–50; Nationality, Nepalese company; Company purpose, any lawful purpose except industry on Negative List; Formation, file Memorandum and Articles of Association with Registrar of Companies.
Public Limited Company: Liability, limited by shares; Name, cannot be deceptively similar to another registered company; Management, at least 3 directors; Shareholders, minimum 7, no maximum, share subscription by public pursuant to a prospectus that complies with Companies Act of 2007 and Securities Act; a Private Limited Company can convert to Public Limited Company by complying with Companies Act of 2007; Founders, minimum 7; Nationality, Nepalese company; Company purpose, any lawful purpose except industry on Negative List; Formation, file Memorandum and Articles of Association with Registrar of Companies.
Branch: Liability, main company remains liable; Name, same as main company; Nationality, foreign company; Company purpose, any lawful purpose except industry on Negative List; Formation, file Memorandum and Articles of Association with Registrar of Companies, plus permission to work in Nepal by concerned authority; Founders, main branch.

New Zealand
Ltd (Limited): ≈ plc or Ltd. (UK). Names of limited liability companies that were registered under the Companies Act 1993 (but not those that were registered under the Companies Act 1955) must end with the word "Limited", the words "Tāpui (Limited)", or the suffix "Ltd".
Look-through company

Nicaragua
The Commercial Code establishes the following types of companies:
S.A.: Sociedad Anónima
Cia.: Sociedad en Nombre Colectivo
Cia. Ltda.: Sociedad en Nombre Colectivo de Responsabilidad Limitada
S.C.S.: Sociedad en Comandita Simple
S.C.A.: Sociedad en Comandita por Acciones

Nigeria
Private Limited Company (Ltd.): a private company limited by shares
Public Limited Company (PLC): a public company limited by shares
Limited by Guarantee (Ltd./Gte.): a company limited by guarantee (non-profit company)
Unlimited (ULtd.): A company with a share capital, similar to its limited company (Ltd., or PLC.) counterparts, but where the liability of the members or shareholders is not limited
Limited Liability Partnership (LLP): Only allowed in the state of Lagos, Nigeria.
Partnership: Arrangement in which parties agree to cooperate to advance their mutual interests.

North Macedonia
A.D./А.Д. (Akcionersko Društvo / Акционерско друштво): ≈ plc (UK) or Joint-stock company
D.O.O./Д.О.О. (Društvo so Ograničena Odgovornost / Друштво со ограничена одговорност): ≈ Ltd. (UK)
D.O.O.E.L./Д.О.О.Е.Л. (Društvo so Ograničena Odgovornost od Edno Lice / Друштво со ограничена одговорност основано од едно лице): type of DOO with a single member
K.D./К.Д. (Komanditno Društvo / Командитно друштво): ≈ limited partnership
K.D.A./К.Д.А. (Komanditno Društvo so Akcie / Командитно друштво со акции): ≈ limited partnership with shares
J.T.D./Ј.Т.Д. (Javno Trgovsko Društvo / Јавно трговско друштво): ≈ General partnership

Oman
 SAOG (Société Anonyme Omanaise Générale) Public Joint Stock Company
 SAOC (Société Anonyme Omanaise Close) Closed Joint Stock Company

Pakistan
There are three main forms of business:

(a) Sole Proprietorship
(b) Partnership
(c) Company

Sole Proprietorship

In a sole proprietorship, an individual on his/her own account carries out the business or profession. No formal procedure or formality is required for setting up a sole proprietary concern.

Partnership

A partnership is a business relationship entered into by a formal agreement between two or more persons or corporations carrying on a business in common. The capital for a partnership is provided by the partners who are liable for the total debts of the firms and who share the profits and losses of the business concern according to the terms of the partnership agreement.

Partnerships (other than banking companies) are generally limited in size to twenty partners. The interest of a partner is transferable only with the prior consent of the other partner(s). However, a partner's right to a share of the partnership income may be received in trust for another person.

For taxation purposes, partnerships are classified into:

(i) Registered Firms
(ii) Unregistered Firms

The income of the registered firm is subject to Super Tax before distribution to the partners. Also the individual income of the partners is subject to income tax at the usual rates.

For unregistered firms, income tax is levied on the firm's income and the partners are not liable to pay tax on the shares of profit received from the unregistered firm(s).

Company

A company is a legal entity formed under the Companies Ordinance, 1984. It can have share capital or can be formed without share capital.

A company having share capital may be formed as:

(i) A company limited by shares.
(ii) A company limited by guarantee.
(iii) An unlimited company.

Company Limited by Shares

The liability of its members is limited to the extent of their shares in the paid-up capital of the company. These companies may further be classified as public limited and private limited companies.

Public Limited Companies can be formed by at least seven persons by subscribing their names to the 'Memorandum and Articles of Association' of the company. The word 'Limited' is used as the last word of its name.
Private Limited Companies may be formed by at least two persons by subscribing their names to the 'Memorandum and Articles of Association' of the company. A private limited company, by its Articles of Association:

(i) Restricts the right to transfer its shares;
(ii) Limits the number of its members to fifty; and;
(iii) Prohibits any invitation to the public to subscribe for shares or debentures of the company.

A private limited company is required to use the words "(Private) Limited" as the last words of its name.

Company Limited By Guarantee

Means a company having the liability of its members limited by memorandum to such amounts as the members may respectively undertake to contribute to the capital of the company in the event of its winding up. A company limited by guarantee is usually formed on a 'non profit basis'. Companies limited by guarantee use the words (Guarantee) Limited" as the last words of their n
Unlimited Company

Means a company having unlimited liability of its members

Peru
S.A. (Sociedad Anónima): ≈ plc (UK)
Sociedad Anónima Abierta (S.A.A.): To qualify to register as an S.A.A., a company must meet one or more conditions laid down in Article 249 of Peru's General Corporation Law. Those conditions state there must be a primary public offering of shares or convertible bonds in stocks, which are held by more than 750 shareholders, more than 35% of its capital belonging to 175 shareholders, or that all shareholders entitled to vote approve the adjustment to the scheme. The S.A.A. is then audited by the Comisión Nacional Supervisora de Empresas y Valores (CONASEV).
Sociedad Anónima Cerrada (S.A.C.): These companies must have a minimum of 2 and a maximum of 20 shareholders. These shares can't be registered in the Public Registry.

Philippines
All legal entities in the Philippines, including the recently approved one-person corporation (OPC), are registered with the Securities and Exchange Commission.
Corporations:
Corporation (Corp.) and Incorporated (Inc.): ≈ Ltd and plc (UK), corporation (US).
Government-owned and controlled corporation (GOCC): ≈ statute corporation (UK), GSE and FOE (US). These use the Corp. and Inc. suffixes as with other corporations.
One-Person Corporation (OPC): ≈ LLC (US). Newly approved corporate equivalent of a sole proprietorship.
Partnerships:
Company (Co.): ≈ general partnership (UK, US). Historically also used by corporations and other legal entities, such as the Manila Railroad Company.
Limited Company (Ltd., Ltd. Co.): ≈ limited partnership (UK, US). Not to be confused with the obsolete private limited company below.
Limited (Liability) Parnership (LP, LLP): ≈ limited partnership and limited liability partnership (UK, US)
Others:
Cooperative (Coop.) ≈ Cooperatives.
Enterprise (Ent.): Used by some sole proprietorships but are not true legal entities.
Obsolete:
Compañía (Cía): For partnerships and other forms of business during the Spanish rule.
Sociedad Anónima (SA, S.A.): Formed under Spanish rule. Replaced by private limited company.
Private limited company (Ltd., Co. Ltd., or Co., Ltd.): ≈ Ltd (UK), LLC (US). Initially used during the early American colonial period, it has been replaced by Corp. and Inc.

Russia

According to the Civil Code of Russian Federation the following corporate entities may be created:
 NGO or NPO: Nonprofit organization. There are many types of non-profits in Russia; the type depends on the ownership of the assets 
 IP: a sole proprietorship; self-employed entrepreneurship.

State companies 
 GP or GUP: state (unitary) enterprise
 MP or MUP (: municipal (unitary) enterprise

Joint-stock companies 
Joint-stock companies:
 OOO: limited liability company (US-like)
 AO: private limited company (ltd) (UK), privately held shares (similar to a close corporation, or closely held corporation, in the US) (maximum fifty "owners of capital" (not shareholders); if there are more than fifty "owners of capital", they have a year to transform into a PAO)
 ПАО (public plc): plc (UK), publicly traded shares (similar to a corporation in the US)
 НПАО (private plc)

Partnerships 

 Cooperative: these include many types, which differ by the type of activity, e.g. farming or other kind of production

These are less common:
  (general partnership)
  (limited partnership). These types of business entities are not popular (approximately 0.5% of the total number of business entities in Russia).
 

Saudi Arabia
 Private Limited Company ( شركة ذات مسئولية محدودة)
 Joint-Stock company ( شركة مساهمة )
 General Partnership Company ( شركة تضامن )
 Limited Partnership (شركة التوصية البسيطة )
 Foreign Company ( شركة أجنبية )
 Individual Establishment ( مؤسسة فردية )

Serbia
d.o.o. / д.о.о. (društvo sa ograničenom odgovornošću / друштво са ограниченом одговорношћу): ≈ Limited liability partnership ≈ Ltd.(UK) ≈ GmbH (Germany).
d.d. / д.д. or a.d. / a.д. (deoničarsko (deoničko) društvo / деоничарско (деоничко) друштво or akcionarsko društvo / aкционарско друштво) ≈ joint-stock company, plc (UK) ≈ AG (Germany)
preduzetnik (preduzetnik / предузетник): ≈ Sole proprietorship (UK)
o.d. / о.д. (ortačko društvo / ортачко друштво): ≈ General partnership (UK)
k.d. / к.д. (komanditno društvo / командитно друштво): ≈ Limited partnership (UK)
j.p. / ј.п. (javno preduzeće / јавно предузеће): ≈ state-owned enterprise

Singapore
Private Limited Company, Sole Proprietorship and Partnership are the predominant types of business found in Singapore.
LLP (limited liability partnership): owners have the flexibility of operating as a partnership while enjoying limited liability. An LLP can sue and be sued, acquire and hold property, and have a common seal.
Pte Ltd/Sdn Bhd (private limited company/Sendirian Berhad): ≈ Ltd. (UK). Maximum 50 shareholders. There also exist "exempt private companies", being either owned by no more than 20 non-corporate shareholders, or wholly state-owned and designated by the finance minister as exempt.
Ltd/Bhd (public limited company/Berhad): ≈ plc (UK). There also exist public companies limited by guarantee, which conduct non-profit activities; the finance minister may approve the registration of such companies without the addition of the word "Limited" or "Berhad" to the name.
Singapore subsidiary company is a popular term used for a form of Singapore business entity. A subsidiary company can have different structures but is essentially a Private Limited Company and so is a separate legal entity. Characteristics of a Singapore subsidiary company include: i) 100% foreign ownership is allowed, ii) the company enjoys low tax incentives as per a resident company, iii) repatriation of profits is allowed and iv) the minimum paid up capital required is S$1. v) As a legal person, a subsidiary company can sue and be sued by others.
Other forms including Pte exist

South Africa
Sole proprietorship/Alleeneienaar
Business trust/Trust
Partnership/Vennootskap
Companies/Maatskappye
Company limited by guarantee
Incorporated association not for gain/vereniging sonder winsoogmerk (section 21 company/artikel 21-maatskappy): ≈ nonprofit association.
Companies having a share capital
Private company/privaat maatskappy: ≈ private limited company (UK), limited liability company (US); has 1 or more shareholders, one or more directors. The name must end "(Pty) Ltd"; registration number ends /07. Registration number and directors' names must appear on all correspondence.
Section 53(b) company (unlimited liability company): ≈ professional limited liability company (PLLC) (US)
Public company/publieke maatskappy (Ltd.): ≈ public limited company (UK), corporation (US); has at least 7 shareholders (unless it is a wholly owned subsidiary of another company) and at least two directors. The company's name must end in "LTD"; its registration number ends in /06.
CC/BK (Close corporation/beslote korporasie): Has 1–10 non-corporate members. The name must end "CC" or "BK"; registration number ends /23. Registration number and members' names must appear on all correspondence. On 1 May 2011 the new Companies Act (Act 71 of 2008) came into force and disallows any new incorporations under this form.

Switzerland

Stiftung /  / fondazione:≈ foundation
investment fund (Anlagefonds / fonds de placement / fondo di investimento)
 Investmentgesellschaft mit festem Kapital / SICAF (société d'investissement à capital fixe) / SICAF (società di investimento a capitale fisso):≈ investment trust (UK), closed-end company (US)
 Investmentgesellschaft mit variablem Kapital / SICAV (société d'investissement à capital variable) / SICAV (società di investimento a capitale variabile):≈ OEIC (open-ended investment company) (UK), open-end company (US)
Verein / association / associazione:≈ non-profit association
wIG (wirtschaftliche Interessengemeinschaft) / GIE (groupement d'intérêt économique) / gruppo di interesse economico:≈ EIG (economic interest grouping)
:≈ sole trader (UK), sole proprietorship (US)
Gesellschaft "business entities"
partnerships (Rechsgemeinschaft / société de personnes / società di persone)
eG (einfache Gesellschaft) / société simple / società semplice:≈ partnership by contract
KolG (Kollektivgesellschaft) / SNC (société en nom collectif) / società in nome collettivo:≈ GP
KG (Kommanditgesellschaft) / SC (société en commandite) / società in accomandita:≈ LP
trading companies (Körperschaft / société de capitaux / società di capitale)
KomAG (Kommanditaktiengesellschaft) / SCA (société en commandite par actions) / società in accomandita per azioni:≈ publicly traded partnership (PTP)
GmbH (Gesellschaft mit beschränkter Haftung) / Sàrl (société à responsabilité limitée) / Sagl (società a garanzia limitata):≈ Ltd. (UK), LLC (US)
AG (Aktiengesellschaft) / SA (société anonyme) / SA (società anonima):≈ plc (UK), Corp. (US/Can)	
Genossenschaft / Scoop (société coopérative) / società cooperativa:≈ co-operative
Zweigniederlassung / succursale / succursale:≈ branch (of a company)

Taiwan (Republic of China)
無限公司 (Unlimited Company)
有限公司 (Limited Company, yǒuxiàn gōngsī)
兩合公司 (Limited Partnership)
股份有限公司 (Public Limited Company or Corporation, gǔfèn yǒuxiàn gōngsī)

Thailand
 บริษัทมหาชนจำกัด, name format บริษัท corporation name จำกัด (มหาชน): plc (UK). Minimum 15 shareholders.
 บริษัทเอกชนจำกัด (name format บริษัท corporation name จำกัด): Ltd. (UK). At least three shareholders.
 ห้างหุ้นส่วนจำกัด (name format ห้างหุ้นส่วน corporation name จำกัด): limited partnership There are two kinds of partnership: Limited partnership which has limited liability of the partnership, and unlimited partner which has unlimited liability to the third party for the partner. The unlimited partnership has the right to control the partnership. On the other hand, the limited partnership has no right to make decision in the partnership.
 ห้างหุ้นส่วนสามัญนิติบุคคล (name format ห้างหุ้นส่วน corporation name): general partnership

Turkey
According to Code of Obligations (fifth book of Civil Code) (Act No: 6098):
Adi Şirket : ≈ Simple Partnership (has no legal personality)

According to the Commercial Code (Act No: 6102):

Şahıs şirketleri ≈ Partnerships (Unlike the partnerships in Anglo-American law, they also have legal personality like companies)
Koll. Şti. (Kolektif şirket): ≈ Collective partnership
Kom. Şti (Komandit şirket) ≈ Commandite partnership Can be established as simple commandite partnership or as commandite company divided into shares (Sermayesi paylara bölünmüş komandit şirket).

Sermaye şirketleri ≈ Companies
A.Ş. / A.O.: ≈ Joint stock company Minimum capital is TL 50,000. Bearer or registered shares, of a minimum par value of TL 0.01 each. Only type of company that can be publicly traded in Turkish Law.
Ltd. Şti. / L.Ş. / L.O. (Limited şirket / Limited Ortaklık) ≈ Limited company Minimum capital is TL 10,000. Registered shares only, of a minimum par value of TRY 25 each.

According to the Capital Markets Act (Act No: 6362):
HAAO ≈ Publicly held corporation This essentially is a special type of A.O. These type of companies can only be established as A.O.'s. When there are no specific rules under Capital Markets legislation, A.O. rules under Turkish Commercial Code will be applied to HAAO's.

According to the Cooperatives Act (Act No: 1136):
Koop. (Kooperatif Şirket) ≈ Cooperative

Other entitites:
 (irtibat bürosu): ≈ Liaison Office
 Şahıs Firması: ≈ Sole Proprietorship
 Şb. (Şube): ≈ Branch

Tunisia
 شركة فردية (Entreprise individuelle)
 شّركة ذات مسؤوليّات محدودة ش.م.م.(Société à responsabilité limitée- SARL)
 شّركة فردية ذات مسؤوليّات محدودة (Société unipersonnelle à responsabilité limitée SUARL)
 شركة خفية الإسم (Société anonyme – SA)
 الشركات ذات رأس المال المتغيّر

Ukraine

DAT/ДАТ (Державне акціонерне товариство / Derzhavne aktsionerne tovarystvo): ≈ plc (UK), national
FOP/ФОП (Фізична особа підприємець / Fizychna osoba pidpryyemets): sole proprietorship
KT/КТ (Командитне товариство / Komandytne tovarystvo): ≈ limited partnership
PT/ПT (Повне товариство / Povne tovarystvo): ≈ general partnership
TDV/ТДВ (Товариство з додатковою відповідальністю / Tovarystvo z dodatkvoiu vidpovidalnistiu): "additional liability company"
TOV/TOB (Товариство з обмеженою відповідальністю / Tovarystvo z obmezhenoiu vidpovidalnistiu): ≈ Ltd. (UK). No minimum capital.
PP/ПП (Приватне підприємство / Pryvatne pidpryyemstvo): ≈ Ltd. (UK). No minimum capital.
PAT/ПАТ (Публічне акціонерне товариство / Publichne aktsionerne tovarystvo) (before 29.04.2009 – VAT/ВАТ( Вiдкрите акцiонерне товариство / Vidkryte aktsionerne tovarystvo)): ≈ plc (UK), public. Minimum capital – 1250 minimum wages (UAH 7,500,000 as of 27.09.2021).
PrAT/ПрАТ (Приватне акціонерне товариство / Prytvatne aktsionerne tovarystvo) (before 29.04.2009 – ZAT/ЗАТ (Закрите акцiонерне товариство / Zakryte Aktsionerne Tovarystvo)): ≈ plc (UK), private. Minimum capital – same as PAT.
AT/АТ (Акціонерне товариство / Aktsionerne tovarystvo): ≈ JSC. Minimum capital – same as PAT.

Company formation is regulated by the Ukrainian Civil Code and Commercial Code, Law On Business Associations, Law On Joint Stock Companies, Law On Limited Liability Companies and Additional Liability Companies.

United Arab Emirates
In UAE Free Zones, a Free Zone Establishment (FZE) or Free Zone Company (FZC) is a limited liability company governed by the rules and regulations of the relevant zone in which it is established.

United Kingdom
CIC (community interest company)
CIO (Charitable Incorporated Organisation)
Industrial and provident society: e.g. a co-operative (which does include Ltd. at the end of its name) or charity
Partnerships
General partnership
LLP (Limited liability partnership)
SLP (Scottish limited partnership)
LP (Limited partnership)
Companies
Private Limited Companies (Ltd or Limited or Welsh Cyfyngedig (Cyf))
Private company limited by shares, The liability is limited to the amount, if any, unpaid on the shares held by them. Its shares cannot be traded publicly.
Private company limited by guarantee. The liability is limited to such amount as the members undertake to contribute to the assets of the company in the event of its being wound up. 
Public Limited Company (PLC or Welsh Cwmni Cyfyngedig Cyhoeddus (CCC)): Is a limited company whose shares may be traded publicly. Requires an authorized minimum share capital of £50,000; of which it must have allotted shares to the value of at least £50,000 and a minimum of 25% must be fully paid up prior to starting business.
Unlimited company (or Welsh (cwmni) anghyfyngedig). There is no limit on the liability of its members. It is not a requirement under company law to add or state the word or designation Unlimited or its abbreviations (Unltd., or Ultd.) at the ending of its legal company name, and most such companies do not do so. Unlimited companies are exempted from filing accounts with the Registrar of Companies for public disclosure, subject to a few exceptions (unless the company was a qualified subsidiary or a parent of a limited company during the accounting period).
Sole proprietorship (Sole traders)

United States
In the United States, most legal entities are incorporated under the law of a particular state. The federal government does not generally incorporate entities (the verb "charter" is used instead), with a few narrow exceptions, either government-sponsored corporations or government-owned corporations.

Those entities existing on the state level have two separate identities: their legal entity type, e.g., partnership, corporation, or LLC, and their tax classification, what they are regarded as for federal income tax purposes. A further way to classify an entity is whether it is a for-profit or nonprofit enterprise, each classification with its own taxonomy and implications on federal income tax law. For-profit entities exist for the purpose of producing a profit for their owners whereas nonprofits exist for any purpose other than profit.

Tax classifications 
For federal tax purposes, the Internal Revenue Service has separate entity classification rules, generally depending on whether an entity is a for-profit or non-profit organization. For-profit entities can be collectively regarded as "taxable organizations" while nonprofit entities are collectively regarded as "tax-exempt organizations" or simply "exempt organizations."

Taxable Organizations
Under the Internal Revenue Code, a for-profit entity may be classified as a corporation, a partnership, a cooperative or a disregarded entity. A corporation is taxed as a C corporation unless it elects and meets the requirements to be taxed as an S Corporation. A disregarded entity has one owner (or a married couple as owner) that is not recognized for tax purposes as an entity separate from its owner, so the owner is taxed on the individual level. Types of disregarded entities include single-member LLCs; qualified sub-chapter S subsidiaries and qualified real estate investment trust subsidiaries. A disregarded entity's transparent tax status does not affect its status under state law. For example, for federal tax purposes, a sole-member LLC (SMLLC) is disregarded, so that all its assets and liabilities are treated as owned by its single member. But under state law, an SMLLC can contract in its own name and its owner is generally not personally liable for the debts and obligations of the entity. To be recognized as a Cooperative for tax purposes Cooperatives must follow certain rules under Sub Chapter T of the Internal Revenue Code.

Tax Exempt Organizations
Nonprofit organizations on the state level are exempt from federal income taxation for most types of income. There are two main types of tax exempt organizations under the Internal Revenue Code: 501(c) organizations and 527 organizations. Tax exemption has two components: exemption from income taxation and the allowance of a deduction on the tax returns of donors.

Section 501(c) encompasses most types of nonprofit entities other than ones engaged substantially in political activity. There are 29 subtypes of 501(c) organizations. For example, section 501(c)(10) includes "domestic fraternal societies, orders, or associations, operating under the lodge system," while section 501(c)(6) includes "business leagues, chambers of commerce, real-estate boards, boards of trade, or professional football leagues" under certain circumstances. The most prevalent type of 501(c)s are 501(c)(3) organizations, known broadly as "charitable organizations," those whose purpose is charitable (i.e., relief from poverty), educational, scientific, religious, or advocatory, among others, as long as such organization does not engage in substantial political activity or inure the benefit of net earnings to shareholders or other individuals. This is the preferred tax status because it is the only 501(c) that obtains both income tax exemption and tax deductible donations. All other 501(c) types only obtain tax exemption.  Section 501(c)(3)s can be further divided into private foundations, public charities, and private operating foundations with private foundations given the least favorable deductibility rate. State-level unincorporated nonprofit associations, charitable trusts, and nonprofit corporations may fall into any one of the 501(c) categories depending on their purpose and the activities they engage in. 

Section 527 organizations, also called "political organizations," are any nonprofit substantially engaged in "political activity," such as election campaigning or lobbying. These are organizations like political parties and election campaign committees, which are often called political action committees (PACs) or Super-PACs. These organizations are subject to more stringent regulations than 501(c) organizations and only receive tax exemption; donations to 527s are not deductible. Any type of nonprofit entity existing on the state level will be regarded as a 527 if it substantially engages in political activity.

Federally chartered
Of the few types of companies that may exist under a federally issued charter, the bulk are banks, credit unions, and similar depository institutions. Such institutions are distinguished from state-chartered banks by including a key word in their formal names. For a bank, the key word is "national". A bank chartered by the Office of the Comptroller of the Currency (OCC) must have the word "national" in its name. A bank chartered by a state cannot have "national" in its name.

For a savings bank (formerly called a savings and loan association) or credit union, the key word is "federal", and the same rules apply; a federally chartered savings bank or credit union must have the word "federal" in its name, while a state chartered savings bank or credit union cannot have "federal" in its name.

Federal Savings Bank (FSB): formerly called federal savings and loan association
National Association (NA): a designation used by banks chartered by the Office of the Comptroller of the Currency (OCC)
National Trust and Savings Association (NT&SA): a less common designation used by national banks
Federal Credit Union: chartered by the National Credit Union Association (NCUA)

Many federal governmental units are specially formed public corporations (which, for tax purposes are also generally 501(c)(1) organizations) and government-sponsored enterprises, while some private organizations have received a Congressional charter.

State, territory or commonwealth; unincorporated

The following are the entity structures that can be created without licensure by the government, or in other words are "unincorporated":

Sole proprietorship: a business consisting of a single owner (which may in turn be a business entity), not in a separately recognized business form.

Trusts
Trust: a legal relationship wherein one person (a "settlor") grants another property to another (a "trustee") for the benefit of a single or limited amount of third-parties ("beneficiaries").
Charitable trust: a trust wherein the beneficiary is the general public.

Partnerships
General partnership: an association of two or more persons for the purpose of producing a profit for the members of the partnership (called "general partners" or simply "partners"). All partners jointly and separately liable for the debts of the partnership. In most U.S. states, it can be created by agreement without requiring a public filing or any written agreement, as long as all parties must have an intend to establish a business relationship with one another. The partners may themselves be individuals or legal entities (in which case it is generally called a joint venture).

To determine whether a general partnership exists courts analyze a few factors: (1) intention of the parties, (2) sharing of profits and losses (3) joint administration and control of business operation, (4) capital investment by each partner, and (5) common ownership of property.

Unincorporated Associations
Unincorporated nonprofit association: an association of two or more persons for the purpose of accomplishing a common goal other than profit; this is the nonprofit equivalent to general partnerships.

State, territory or commonwealth; incorporated

Partnerships
Limited partnership (LP): a partnership where at least one partner (the general partner, which may itself be an entity or an individual) has unlimited liability for the LP's debts and one or more partners (the limited partners) have limited liability (which means that they are not responsible for the LP's debts beyond the amount they agreed to invest). Limited partners generally do not participate in the management of the entity or its business.
Limited liability partnership (LLP): a partnership where a partner's liability for the debts of the partnership is limited except in the case of liability for acts of professional negligence or malpractice. In some states, LLPs may only be formed for purposes of practicing a licensed profession, typically attorneys, accountants and architects. This is often the only form of limited partnership allowed for law firms (as opposed to general partnerships).
Limited liability limited partnership (LLLP): a combination of LP and LLP, available in some states.

Limited Liability Companies
Limited liability company (LLC, LC, Ltd., or Co.): a form of business whose owners enjoy limited liability, but which is not a corporation. Allowable abbreviations vary by state. Note that in some states Ltd. by itself is not a valid abbreviation for an LLC, because in some states (e.g. Texas), it may denote a corporation instead. See also Series LLC. For U.S. federal tax purposes, in general, an LLC with two or more members is treated as a partnership, and an LLC with one member is treated as a sole proprietorship.
Professional limited liability company (PLLC): some states do not allow certain professionals to form an LLC that would limit the liability that results from the services professionals provide such as doctors, medical care; lawyers, legal advice; and accountants, accounting services; architects, architectural services; when the company formed offers the services of the professionals. Instead those states allow a PLLC or in the LLC statutes, the liability limitation only applies to the business side, such as creditors of the company, as opposed to the client/customer service side, the level of medical care, legal services, or accounting provided to clients. This is meant to maintain the higher ethical standards that these professionals have committed themselves to by becoming licensed in their profession and to prevent them from being immune (or at least limit their immunity) to malpractice suits.
Low-profit limited liability company (L3C): a hybrid for-profit and nonprofit entity available in some states. It is an LLC that is allowed to have a primary nonprofit purpose, and a secondary for-profit purpose.

Corporations

For-profit
Corporation (Corp., Inc., or Incorporated): a legal entity that is owned by shareholders and managed by directors and officers, all of which enjoy limited liability. A corporation can be a public or private company. In some states other suffixes may be used to identify a corporation, such as Ltd., Co./Company, or the Italian term S.p.A. (in Connecticut; see under Italy). Some states that allow the use of "Company" prohibit the use of "and Company", "and Co.", "& Company" or "& Co.". In most states sole proprietorships and partnerships may register a fictitious "doing business as" name with the word "Company" in it. For a full list of allowed designations by state, see the table below. 
Benefit corporation (PBC): a for-profit corporation that includes positive impact on society, workers, the community, and the environment in addition to profit as its legally defined goals, in that the definition of "best interest of the corporation" is specified to include those impacts. Some states require the corporation to have "Public Benefit Corporation" or "PBC" in its name (or a similar designation), while others allow any prefix allowed by a corporation (such as Corp. or Inc.), but require that shareholders, investors, and other parties be informed that the company is a public benefit corporation.
Professional corporation (PC or P.C.): those corporate entities for which many corporation statutes make special provision, regulating the use of the corporate form by licensed professionals such as attorneys, architects, accountants, and doctors.

Nonprofit
Nonprofit corporation: a corporation whose primary purpose is to serve a social goal instead of producing a profit for shareholders. As such, nonprofit corporations do not have shareholders but may still have directors and officers which still enjoy limited liability. The naming conventions for nonprofit corporations vary, with naming requirements similar to those of other corporate entities, with some states forbidding names that might mislead the public. Nonprofit corporations are generally divided into three subcategories:
Public-benefit nonprofit corporation: a nonprofit corporation formed for the purpose of benefitting the public at large, such as charities, educational and research institutions, and hospitals.
Mutual-benefit nonprofit corporation: a nonprofit corporation formed for the purpose of benefitting its members, such as unions, professional or homeowner's associations, and social clubs.
Religious corporation: a nonprofit corporation formed for the purpose of practicing or proselytizing a religion, such as an organized congregation or missionary organization.

Cooperatives
Cooperative (Co-Op, Coop, or CP): a for-profit entity owned and democratically operated by a group of people who share a common economic goal, such as worker cooperatives, agricultural cooperatives, or a utility cooperatives. In most states, a cooperative must have a signifier in its name indicating that it is a cooperative, such as coop, co-op, CP, or cooperative.

Other
Doing Business As (DBA or Fictitious Name): a business name used by a person or entity that is different from the person's or entity's true legal name. DBAs are not separate entities and do not shield the person or entity who uses the DBA as a business name from liability for debts or lawsuits. Filing requirements vary and are not permitted for some types of businesses or professional practices.

Table of Required designations for for-profit corporations, by U.S. state, territory or commonwealth

Uruguay
 S.A. (Sociedad Anónima). Company by shares.
 S.A.S. (Sociedad por Acciones Simplificada). A simplified version of the S.A.
 S.R.L. (Sociedad de Responsabilidad Limitada). Limited liability company.
 S.C.I. (Sociedad de Capital e Industria). A company with segregated shares between capital and labor.
 S.C. (Sociedad Colectiva). A company with unlimited liability between its members.

Uzbekistan
 MChJ (Mas'uliyati Cheklangan Jamiyat/Масъулияти Чекланган Жамият): limited liability company
 QMJ (Qo'shimcha ma'suliyatli jamiyat/Қўшимча масъулиятли жамият): additional liability company
 AJ (Aksiyadorlik jamiyati/Акциядорлик жамияти): joint-stock company
 OAJ (Ochiq aksiyadorlik jamiyati/Очиқ акциядорлик жамияти): public joint-stock company
 YoAJ (Yopiq aksiyadorlik jamiyati/Ёпиқ акциядорлик жамияти): closed joint-stock company
 XK (Xususiy korxona/Хусусий корхона): private company
 XT (Xususiy tadbirkorlik/Хусусий тадбиркорлик): sole proprietorship
 OK (Oilaviy korxona/Оилавий корхона): family company
 UK (Unitar korxona/Унитар корхона): unitary enterprise
 QK (Qo'shma korxona/Қўшма корхона): joint venture

Venezuela
S.A. (Sociedad Anónima): ≈ plc (UK)
S.R.L. (Sociedad de Responsabilidad Limitada): ≈ Ltd. (UK): ≈ limited liability company (USA)
S.C.S. (Sociedad en Comandita Simple): ≈ limited partnership
Soc.Col. (Sociedad Colectiva): ≈ general partnership (USA)

Vietnam
 Cty TNHH (Công ty trách nhiệm hữu hạn / "Company with Limited Liablity"): Limited Liability Company
 Cty TNHH MTV (Công ty trách nhiệm hữu hạn một thành viên/ "Limited Liablity Company with a Single member") since 2005
 Cty CP (Công ty cổ phần / "Company with Joint Stock"): Joint Stock Company
 Công ty hợp danh / "Company of Partners": Partnership
 Doanh nghiệp hợp danh / "Enterprise Partnership": Partnership
 DNNN (Doanh nghiệp nhà nước / "Enterprise of the State"): State-Owned Enterprise
 DNTN (Doanh nghiệp tư nhân / "Enterprise Private"): Proprietorship
 DTNN (Doanh nghiệp có vốn đầu tư nước ngoài "Enterprise with Foreign Investment"): Foreign Investment Enterprise
 HTX (Hợp tác xã/ Co-operation)
 Chi nhánh : Branch Company
 Nhóm Cty (Công Ty / "Group Company"): Holding Company

See also
List of company registers
ISO 20275

Notes

References

External links

Business law
Business-related lists
Corporate law
Legal entities